The history and the discography of the Island Records label can conveniently be divided into three phases:
The Jamaican Years, covering the label's releases from 1959 to 1966
The New Ground Years, covering 1967 to approximately 1980.
The Consolidation Years, covering 1980 onwards. In 1989, Chris Blackwell sold Island Records to PolyGram, resulting in a remarketing of the Island back catalogue on compact disc under the Island Masters brand.

Jamaican releases (1959–1962)
Blackwell released 28 singles and three LPs in this period.

Jamaican singles
The very first records have been issued on 7" sides in Jamaica on a label called R&B
Laurel Aitken: "Boogie In My Bones"
Ernest Ranglin: "Wranglin'"
Lord Lebby With The Caribs: "Caldonie"

Jamaican LPs
CB stands for Chris Blackwell; 22 for the age of Blackwell at the time; it is the first number of the LP catalogue.
CB21 - Lance Hayward: Lance Hayward at the Half Moon Hotel
CB22 - Lance Hayward: Lance Hayward at the Half Moon Hotel, Volume 2
CB23 - Ernest Ranglin: Guitar In Ernest
CBLP24 - Owen Gray: Sings

UK releases 1960s 
After the company's start in London in 1962 Island Records diversified already in 1963 into various labels: Black Swan, Island, Sue and Jump Up.

Singles of the 1960s 
The first Island "white and red" label was used mainly for Jamaican productions released in the United Kingdom. Catalogue numbers started at WI-001. Many of these records had been released previously in Jamaica and other territories on small local labels. For a variety of reasons details of the artists and songs printed on the labels do not always match what is actually to be found in the grooves of the record! The main Island label was soon joined by another three labels: Sue for black American music with catalogue numbers starting at WI-300, Black Swan for more Jamaican music starting with WI-400, and Jump Up, for Calypso and Trinidadian music, starting with 500, but using another prefix (JU). The Aladdin label was started in about 1965 and used numbers starting with 600, using the WI prefix.

Island (white and red label) 
Island singles were released with prefix WI and numbers starting with 001. The Island label itself was white with red lettering and logotypes - for the first 100 releases it had a round "Flaming sun" logo on a white label, then and for reprints of the early issues a red strip across the centre of the label like a "bow tie". The labels have the Rutland Gate Mews address on all first pressings up until about number 14; this was followed by the London England address which goes up to at least # 47, then came Cambridge Road.

(N.B. This discography has been expanded and corrected using the published discography in "Record Collector" magazine 201, published May 1996. Details can also be checked online, at the "45cat" database, which contains many label scans. As far as possible, the listings below reflect what is actually written on the record label. Known variations or labelling errors are given in brackets after the entry.)

WI-001 - Lord Creator: "Independent Jamaica" (later expanded to "Independent Jamaica Calypso" and later still corrected to "Independent Jamaica Calypso") b/w "Remember", 14/6/1962 (B-side actually titled "Remember Your Mother & Father"; a version released to celebrate the 1st Anniversary of Jamaican independence had the full title on the label.)
WI-002 - Owen Gray: "Patricia" b/w "Twist Baby", 14/6/1962
WI-003 - The Jiving Juniors: "Sugar Dandy" b/w "Valerie", 1962;
WI-004 - Derrick Morgan: "Travel On" b/w "Teach Me Baby", 1962
WI-005 - Roy and Millie: "We'll Meet" b/w Roland Alphonso: "Back Beat", 1962 (B-side is with uncredited City Slickers); Collectable Records.ru
WI-006 - Derrick Morgan: "The Hop" b/w "Tell It To Me", 1962
WI 007 - Lloyd Clarke: "Love You The Most" b/w Lloyd Robinson: "You Said You Loved Me", 1962
WI 008 - Wilfred Jackie Edwards: "All My Days" b/w "Hear Me Cry", 1962
WI 009 - Alton and Eddy: "Let Me Dream" b/w "My Love Divine", 1962
WI 010 - The Continentals: "Give Me All Your Love" b/w "Going Crazy", 1962
WI-011 - Derrick Morgan: "Forward March" b/w "Please Don't Talk About Me", 1962 (B-side act. with Eric Morris); Collectable Records.ru
WI-012 - Jimmy Cliff: "Hurricane Hatty" b/w "Dearest Beverley", 1962
WI 013 - Derrick Morgan: "See The Blind" b/w "Cherry Home", 1962
WI 014 - Owen Gray: "Jezebel" b/w Owen & Millie: "Sugar Plum", 1962
WI 015 - Ernest Ranglin Orchestra: "Harmonica Twist" b/w "Nitty Gritty", 1962
WI 016 - Jimmy Cliff: "Miss Jamaica" b/w "Gold Digger", 1962
WI 017 - Errol Dixon: "Morning Train" b/w "Lonely Heart", 1962
WI 018 - Derrick & Patsy: "Housewife's Choice" b/w "Gypsy Woman", 1962
WI 019 - Wilfred Jackie Edwards: "One More Week" b/w "Tears Like Rain", 1962
WI 020 - Owen Gray with Ernest Rauglin (sic.) Orchestra: "Audrey" b/w Owen Gray: "Dolly Baby", 1962
WI 021 - Don Drummond Orchestra: "Schooling The Duke" b/w "Bitter Rose", 1962 (B-side act. Shenley Duffas)
WI-022 - Emanuel Rodrigues Ork.: "Rico Special" b/w Bunny & Skitter: "A Little Mashin'", 1962
WI 023 - The Blues Busters: "Behold!" b/w "Oh! Baby", 1962
WI 024 - Martin & Derrick: "Come On" b/w Monty & the Cyclones: "Organisation", 1962
WI 025 - Jimmy Cliff: "Since Lately" b/w "I'm Free", 1962
WI 026 - Theo Beckford: "I Don't Want You" (actually by King Edwards All Stars) b/w "Seven Long Years", 1962
WI 027 - The Jiving Juniors: "Andrea" b/w "Don't Leave Me", 1962
WI 028 - Bobby Aitken: "Baby Baby" (actually with Patsy) b/w "Lonely Boy", 1962
WI 029 - The Hi-Tones: "Going Steady" b/w "Darlin' Elaine", 1962
WI-030 - Owen Gray: "Midnight Track" b/w "Time Will Tell", 1962;
WI 031 - Wilbert Harrison: "Off To School" b/w "I'm Broke", 1962
WI 032 - The Rhythm Aces: "C-H-R-I-S-T-M-A-S" b/w Top Grant: "A Christmas Drink", 1962
WI 033 - Basil Gabbidon: "I Found My Baby" (actually by Roy Braham) b/w "No Fault Of Mine", 1962
WI 034 - Top Grant: "Searchin' (For You)" b/w "David And Goliath", 1963
WI 035 - The Vikings: "Maggie Don't Leave Me" b/w "Henchman" (both actually with Victor Wong), 1963 (The Vikings are actually The Maytals)
WI-036 - Shenley Duffas: "Give To Get" b/w Shenley & Millie: "What You Gonna Do", 1963;
WI 037 - Derrick Morgan: "Dorothy" b/w "Leave Her Alone", 1963
WI 038 - Lascelles Perkins & Yvonne: "Tango Lips" b/w Dennis Sindrey: "Rub Up" (B-side actually plays "Jamaica's Song"), 1963
WI 039 - Cornell Campbell: "Rosabelle" b/w "Turndown Date" (B-side act. "Under The Old Oak Tree"), 1963
WI 040 - King Edwards (Group): "Dear Hearts" b/w "Oh Mary" (b-side actually by Ransford Barnett), 1963
WI 041 - John Holt: "I Cried A Tear" b/w "Forever I'll Stay", 1963
WI 042 - Jackie Estick: "Since You've Been Gone" b/w "Daisy I Love You", 1963
WI 043 - The Moonlighters: "Going Out" b/w "Hold My Hands", 1963
WI 044 - Clancy Eccles: "Judgement" b/w Clancy & Paulette: "Baby Please", 1962
WI 045 - Lloyd Clarke: "Japanese Girl" b/w "He's Coming", 1963
WI 046 - Kent & Dimples: "Day Is Done" b/w "Linger A While", 1963
WI 047 - King Edwards: "Russian Roulette" (actually by King Edwards All Stars) b/w "You're Mine" (B-side actually by Douglas Brothers), 1963
WI 048 - Owen Gray: "I'm Still Waiting" b/w "Last Night", 1963
WI 049 - The Melody Enchanters: "Enchanter's Ball" b/w "I'll Be True", 1963
WI 050 - Roy & Millie: "This World" b/w "Never Say Goodbye", 1963
WI-051 - Derrick Morgan: "Blazing Fire" b/w Derrick & Patsy: "I'm In A Jam", 1963
WI 052 - Top Grant: "Suzie" b/w "Jenny", 1963
WI 053 - Derrick Morgan: "No Raise, No Praise" b/w "Loving Baby", 1963
WI 054 - Desmond Decker & Beverleys All Stars: "Madgie" b/w Desmond Dekker: "Honour Your Mother And Father", 1963
WI 055 - Derrick & Patsy: "Sea Wave" b/w "Look Before You Leap", 1963
WI 056 - Andy & Joey: "Have You Ever" b/w "Cross My Heart", 1963
WI 057 - Adam Smith: "I Wonder Why" b/w "My Prayer", 1963 (Adam Smith was a pseudonym for Eric Smith)
WI 058 - Frank Cosmo: "Revenge" b/w "Laughin' At You" (B-side actually with Bobby Aitken), 1963
WI 059 - Tony & Louise: "Ups And Downs" b/w Tony Tomas: "Brixton Lewisham", 1963
WI 060 - The Richard Brothers: "I Need A Girl" b/w "Desperate Lover", 1963
WI 061 - Charley Tabor: "Blue Atlantic" b/w "Red Lion Madison", 1963
WI 062 - Jimmy Cliff: "My Lucky Day" b/w "One-Eyed Jacks", 1963
WI 063 - Shenley Duffas: "Fret Man Fret" b/w "Doreen", 1963
WI 064 - The Tonettes: "Love That Is Real" b/w "Pretty Baby", 1963
WI 065 - The Vikings: "Hallelujah!" b/w "Helpin' Ages" (actually by The Maytals), 1963
WI 066 - Kentrick Patrick: "Man To Man" b/w Roland Alfonso: "Blockade", 1963
WI-067 - Roy & Paulette: "Have You Seen My Baby" b/w "Since You're Gone", 1963
WI 068 - Tony Washington: "Something Gotta Be Done" b/w Tony & Louise: "I Have Said", 1963
WI 069 - Errol Dixon: "I Love You" b/w "Tell Me More", 1963
WI-070 - Jimmy Cliff: "King Of Kings" b/w Sir Percy: "Oh Yeah", 1963
WI 071 - The Afro Enchanters: "Peace And Love" b/w "Wayward African", 1963
WI 072 - Top-Grant: "Riverbank Coberley" b/w "Nancy", 1963
WI 073 - Frank Cosmo: "Dear Dreams" b/w "Go Go Go", 1963
WI 074 - Top Grant: "Money Money Money" b/w "Have Mercy On Me", 1963
WI 075 - The Vikings: "Six And Seven Books Of Moses" b/w "Zacions" (actually by The Maytals), 1963
WI 076 - Basil Gabbidon: "I Bet You Don't Know" b/w Shenley Duffas: "Three Times Seven", 1963
WI 077 - Top Grant: "War In Africa" b/w "The Birds", 1963
WI 078 - The Blues Masters: "5 O'Clock Whistle" b/w "African Blood" (both actually by Baba Brooks & His Band), 1963
WI 079 - Kentrick Patrick: "Don't Stay Out Late" b/w "Forever And Ever", 1963
WI 080 - Derrick Morgan: "Angel With Blue Eyes" b/w "Corner Stone", 1963
WI 081 - Higgs & Wilson: "Last Saturday Morning" b/w "Praise The Lord", 1963
WI 082 - Edwards Grp: "He Gave You To Me" b/w "Kings Priests & Prophets" (both actually by The Schoolboys), 1963
WI 083 - Cornell Campbell: "Each Lonely Night" b/w Roland Alphonso: "Steamline", 1963
WI 084 - Duke White: "It's Over" b/w "Forever", 1963
WI 085 - Drumbago: "I Am Drunk" (actually by Raymond Harper & Drumbago's Group) b/w "Sea Breeze" (actually by Sammy & Drumbago's Group), 1963
WI 086 - The Hi-Tones: "Ten Virgins" (actually by The Angelic Brothers) b/w "Too Young To Love" (actually by Larry Marshall), 1963
WI 087 - King Edwards: "Hey Girl" b/w "Skies Are Grey" (both actually by Ransford Barnett), 1963
WI 088 - Robert Marley: "Judge Not" b/w "Do You Still Love Me", 1963
WI 089 - Basil Gabbidon: "St. Louis Woman" b/w "Get On The Ball", 1963
WI-090 - Roy and Millie: "There'll Come A Day" b/w "I Don't Want You", 1963; Collectable Records.ru
WI 091 - Larry Lawrence: "Garden Of Eden" b/w Derrick Morgan: "Sendin' This Message", 1963
WI 092 - Laurel Aitken: "I Shall Remove" b/w "We Got To Move", 1963
WI 093 - Shenley Duffus: "What A Disaster" b/w "I Am Rich", 1963
WI 094 - Don Drummond: "Scandal" b/w "My Ideal" (B-side actually by W. Sparks), 1963
WI 095 - Laurel Aitken: "What A Weeping" b/w "Zion City Wall", 1963
WI-096 - Baba Brooks: "Bank To Bank Pt. 1" b/w "Bank To Bank Pt. 2", 1963;
WI 097 - Delroy Wilson: "I Shall Not Remove" b/w "Naughty People", 1963
WI 098 - Clancy Eccles: "Glory Halleluja" b/w "Hot Rod" (B-side actually by Roland Alphonso), 1963
WI 099 - Laurel Aitken: "In My Soul" b/w "One More River To Cross", 1963
WI 100 - Frank Cosmo: "Merry Christmas" b/w Greetings From Beverley's, 1963
WI 101 - The Vikings: "Never Grow Old" b/w "Irene" (actually by The Maytals), 1963
WI 102 - Tommy McCook: "Adams Apple" b/w The Maytals: "Every Time" (B-side actually by The Tonettes), Tapir's, 1963
WI 103 - Delroy Wilson: "One, Two, Three" b/w "Back Biter", 1963
WI 104 - Kentrick Patrick: "The End Of The World" b/w "Little Princess", 1963
WI 105 - Creator and Norma: "We Will be Lovers" b/w "Come On Pretty Baby", 1963
WI 106 - Theo Beckford: "Boller Man" b/w "Daphney", 1963
WI 107 - The Vikings: "Just Got To Be" b/w "You Make Me Do" (actually by The Maytals), 1963
WI-108 - Tanamo: "Come Down" b/w "I Am Holding On" (white+red label), 1964;
WI 109 - Richard Bros: "I Shall Wear A Crown" b/w Baba Brooks: "Robin Hood", 1963
WI 110 - Stranger Cole: "Stranger at the Door" b/w "Conqueror", 1963
WI-111 - Desmond Dekker: "Parents" b/w "Labour For Learning" (white+red label), 1963;
WI 112 - Jimmy Cliff: "Miss Universe" b/w "The Prodigal", 1963
WI 113 - Stranger & Patsy: "Senor and Senorita" b/w Don Drummond: "Snowboy", 1963
WI 114 - Stranger Cole: "Last Love" b/w Stranger & Ken: "Hush Baby", 1963
WI 115 - Shenley Duffas: "Know The Lord" b/w Tommy McCook: "Ska Ba", 1963
WI 116 - Delroy Wilson: "You Bend My Love" b/w "Can't You See", 1963
WI 117 - The Vikings: "Fever" b/w "Cheer Up" (actually by The Maytals), 1963
WI 118 - Tommy McCook: "Below Zero" b/w Lee Perry: "Never Get Weary", 1963
WI 119 - Kentrick Patrick: "Golden Love" b/w "Beyond", 1963
WI-120 - Paulette & Delroy: "Little Lover" b/w "Lovin' Baby" (white+red label), 1963;
WI 121 - Lester Sterling: "Clean The City" b/w "Long Walk Home" (B-side actually by The Charmers), 1963
WI 122 - Bonnie & Skitto: "Get Ready" (actually by The Vikings, alias The Maytals) b/w Don Drummond: "The Rocket", 1963
WI 123 - Horace Sexton: "I'm So Glad" b/w "Tell Me", 1963
WI 124 - Tommy McCook: "Junior Jive" b/w Horace Seaton: "Power", 1963
WI 125 - Shenley Duffas: "Easy Squeal" b/w "Things Aren't Going Right", 1963
WI 126 - Stranger Cole: "We Are Rolling" b/w "Millie Maw", 1963
WI 127 - Baba Brooks: "Three Blind Mice" b/w Billy & Bobby: "We Ain't Got Nothing", 1963
WI-128 - Ernest Ranglin: "Exodus" b/w Robert Marley: "One Cup Of Coffee", 1963
WI 129 - The Jiving Juniors: "Sugar Dandy" b/w "Valerie", 1963 (reissue)
WI 130 - The Flames: "He's The Greatest" b/w Someone Going To Bawl (both actually by The Maytals), 1964
WI 131 - Lord Briscoe: "Praise For I" b/w "Tell You The Story", 1964
WI 132 - Kentrick Patrick: "Take Me To The Party" b/w "I'm Sorry", 1964
WI 133 - Stranger Cole: "Til My Dying Days" b/w Stranger & Patsy: "I Need You", 1964
WI 134 - Sonny & Yvonne: "Life Without Fun" b/w Sonny Burke Group: "Mount Vesuvius", 1964
WI 135 - Frank Cosmo: "Better Get Right" b/w "Ameletia", 1964
WI 136 - The Flames: "Little Flea" b/w "Good Idea" (both actually by The Maytals), 1964
WI 137 - Stranger Cole: "Goodbye Peggy" (actually plays "Goodbye Peggy Daring" by Roy Panton) b/w Baba Brooks: "Portrait of my Love", 1964
WI 138 - The Flames: "When I Get Home" b/w "Neither Silver Nor Gold" (both actually by The Maytals), 1964
WI 139 - The Flames: "Broadway Jungle" b/w "Beat Lied" (both actually by The Maytals), 1964
WI 140 - Kentrick Patrick: "I Am Wasting Time" b/w Randy's Group: "Royal Charley", 1964
WI 141 - Stranger & Patsy: "Oh Oh I Need You" b/w Don Drummond: "J.F.K.'s Memory", 1964
WI 142 - Eric Morris: "Penny-Reel" b/w Duke Reid's Group: "Darling When" (actually by Dotty & Bonnie), 1964
WI-143 - Dotty and Bonny: "Your Kisses" b/w "Why Worry" (white+red label), 1964;
WI-144 - Stranger and Patsy: "Tom, Dick & Harry" b/w "We Two, Happy People" (white+red label), 1964;
WI 145 - Joe White: "When Are You Young" b/w "Wanna Go Home", 1964
WI-146 - Owen and Leon: "Next Door Neighbour" b/w Roland Alphonso: Feeling Fine, 1964;
WI 147 - Eric Morris: "Mama No Fret" b/w Frankie Anderson: "Santa Lucia" (actually with Roland Alphonso), 1964
WI-148 - Dotty and Bonny: "Dearest" b/w "Tears Are Falling" (white+red label), 1964;
WI 149 - Don Drummond: "Eastern Standard Time" b/w Dotty & Bonny: "Sun Rises", 1964
WI 150 - Eric Morris: "Drop Your Sword" b/w "Catch a Fire" (actually by Roland Alphonso), 1964
WI 151 - Eric Morris: "What A Man Doeth" b/w Duke Reid's Group: "Rude Boy" (actually by Baba Brooks), 1964;
WI 152 - Stranger and Patsy: "Yeah Yeah Baby" b/w Baba Brooks: "Boat Ride", 1964
WI 153 - Don Drummond: "Musical Storeroom" b/w Stranger Cole: "He Who Feels", 1964
WI-154 - The Charms: "Carry Go, Bring Home" (actually by Justin Hinds & the Dominoes) b/w "Hill And Gully" (actually by L. Reid's Group), 1964
WI 155 - Sonny Burke Group: "Live And Let Live" b/w "Our Love Is True", 1964
WI 156 - Sonny Burke: "Write Your Name" b/w "It Means So Much", 1964
WI 157 - Derrick Harriott: "What Can I Do (The Wedding)" b/w "Leona", 1964
WI 158 - Desmond Dekkar (sic.) & his Cherry Pies: "Jeserine" b/w "King Of Ska", 1964 (The Cherry Pies are actually The Maytals)
WI 159 - Joe White: "Hog In A Co Co" b/w Skatalites: "Sandy Gully", 1964
WI 160 - Stranger and Patsy: "Miss B" b/w "Thing Come To Those Who Wait", 1964
WI 161 - The Skatalites: "Trip To Mars" b/w Dottie and Bonnie: "Bunch of Roses", 1964
WI 162 - Don Drummond: "Garden of Love" b/w Stranger Cole: "Cherry May", 1964
WI 163 - Owen and Leon: "My Love For You" b/w "How Many Times", 1964
WI 164 - Owen and Leon: "The Fits Is On Me" b/w Skatalites: "Good News", 1964
WI 165 - Owen and Leon: "Running Around" b/w Skatalites: "Around The World", 1964
WI 166 - Joe White: "Downtown Girl" b/w The Richard Bros: "You Are My Sunshine", 1964 (b-side actually plays "Cool Smoke" by Don Drummond)
WI 167 - The Vikings: "Daddy" b/w "It's You" (both actually by The Maytals), 1964
WI 168 - The Skatalites: "Guns Of Navarone" (actually by Roland Alphonso and Studio One Orchestra) b/w "Marcus Garvey" (actually plays "Where's Marcus Garvey" by Bongoman Byfield), 1965 (UK #36, April 1967)
WI 169 - Stranger Cole with Owen & Leon: "Koo Koo Doo" b/w Gloria & the Dreamletts: "Stay Where You Are", 1965
WI 170 - Derak (sic.) Harriott: "I'm Only Human" b/w Roy Panton: "Good Man", 1965
WI 171 - Justin Hinds and the Dominoes: "Botheration" b/w "Satan", 1965
WI 172 - Sam Houston: "My Mother's Eyes" b/w "Danny Boy", 1965
WI-173 - Carlos Malcolm and The Afro Caribs: "Bonanza Ska" b/w "Papa Luiga", 1965; Collectable Records.ru
WI 174 - Justin Hinds and the Dominoes: "Jump Out Of Frying Pan" b/w "Holy Dove", 1965
WI 175 - The Skatalites: "Dragon Weapon" b/w Desmond Dekkar and Four Aces: "It Was Only A Dream", 1965
WI 176 - Riots: "Telling Lies" b/w "Don't Leave Me" (actually by The Techniques), 1965
WI 177 - Stranger Cole and Baba Brooks: "Run Joe" b/w Stranger Cole: "Make Believe", 1965
WI 180 - The Clarendonians: Day Will Come, 1965;
WI-181 - Desmond Dekkar (sic.): "Get Up Edina" (actually with The Four Aces) b/w Patsy & Desmond: "Be Mine Forever" (B-side actually plays "Down Down Down" by Clive & Naomi), 1965;
WI 183 - Eric Morris: Love Can Make A Mansion, 1965;
WI 184 - Shenley Duffus: You are mine / Upcoming Willows: Red China
WI 186 - Shenley Duffas: Rukumbine / One Morning, 1965
WI 187 - Lloyd Briscoe: Jonah (The Master) / Mr. Cleveland
WI 188 - The Wailers: "It Hurts To Be Alone" / "Mr. Talkative", 1965
WI 190 - Wilfred And Millicent: The Vow / I'll Never Believe In You
WI 191	- The Skatalites: Doctor Kildare / Roland Alphonso: Sucu Sucu
WI 192 - Don Drummond and Drumbago: "Stampede" / Justin Hinds and the Dominoes: Come bail me
WI 194 - Justin Hinds & the Dominoes: Rub Up Push Up / The Ark, 1965
WI 196 - Virtues: Your Wife And Your Mother / Amen
WI 199 - Tommy McCook And His Skatalites : Fast Mouth / The Harder They Come The Harder They Fall, 1965
WI-200 - The Maytals: Never You Change / What's on your mind
WI-206 - The Wailers: "Play Boy"
WI 210 - Lee Perry: "Please Don't Go" / "Bye St. Peter"
WI 213 - The Maytals: My new name / It's no use, 1965
WI 214 - The Blues Busters: How Sweet It Is (white+red label), 1965
WI 215 - Peter Touch and the Wailers: Shame and Scandal / Wailers: The Jerk
WI 217 - Roland Alphonso: "El Pussy Cat"
WI 218 - Joe Haywood: "Warm And Tender Love"
WI 223 - The Upsetters: "Country Girl" / "Strange country" 1965
WI 224 - Desmond Dekker And The Four Aces: "Mount Zion", 1965
WI 231 - Techniques: Little "Did You Know" / Don Drummond: "Cool Smoke"
WI 232 - Tommy McCook: "Rocket Ship" / Justin Hinds: "Turn Them Back", 1965
WI 234 - Eric Morris: Children of today / Baba Brooks: Greenfield Ska, 1965
WI 235 - Baba Brooks: "Duck Soup" b/w The Zodiacs: "Renegade"
WI 236 - Justin Hinds: "Peace And Love" / "Skalarama"
WI 237 - Derrick Harriott: "My Three Loves / The Jerk
WI 238 - The Pioneers: "Sometimes" (white+red label), 1965
WI 239 - Alton Ellis: "Dance Crasher" / Baba Brooks: "Vitamin A", 1965
WI 240 - Two Kings: Rolling Stone / The Sufferer: Tomorrow Morning
WI 244 - Desmond Dekker & The Aces: "Mount Zion"
WI 246 - Theo Beckford: "If Life Was A Thing" (white+red label), 1965
WI 250 - Daniel Johnson: Brother Nathan, 1965
WI 251 - Lee Roy: "Oo Ee Baby" / My loving Baby / Come Back
WI 253 - Millie and Jackie: Never Again / Jackie Edwards: This Is My Story
WI 256 - Rosco Gordon: "Surely I Love You"
WI 257 - Shirley & Lee: "Let The Good Times Roll"
WI 262 - Llans Thelwell and his Celestials: "Choo Choo Ska"
WI 265 - Jackie and Millie: My Desire / Millie: That's How Strong My Love Is
WI 268 - Wailers: "Put It On" / "Love Won't Be Mine", (white+red label)
WI 269 - The Gaylads: What Is Wrong
WI 273 - Roy C: "Shotgun Wedding" b/w "I'm Gonna Make It" OR "High School Dropout", 1966 (Record was pressed with two different b-sides; UK #11, April 1966)
WI 275 - Leapers Creepers Sleepers: "Precious Words"
WI 277 - Derrick Morgan: "It's Alright" / "I Need Someone", 1966
WI 278 - Kim Fowley: "The Trip"
WI 279 - The Circles: "Take Your Time"
WI 280 - Wynder K. Frog: "Turn On Your Lovelight"
WI 281 - The Gaylads: Goodbye daddy / Your eyes, 1966
WI 284 - The Clarendonians: Try Me One More Time / You can't keep me down (white+ red label), 1966
WI 285 - King Sparrow: Beggars Have No Choice / Marcia Griffith: Funny, 1965
WI 286 - Robert Parker: "Barefootin'" b/w "Let's Go Baby", 1966 (UK #24, August 1966)
WI 291 - The Gaylads: You Never Leave Him / Message To My Girl
WI 295 - Desmond Baker And The Clarendonians: Rude Boy - Gonna Jail / The Sharks: Don't Fool Me, 1966
WI 297 - Roy Richards: Green Collie / Marcia Griffith: "You're No Good"
WI 298 - King Perry: Rub And Squeeze / Soul Brothers: Here Comes The Minx
WI 299 - Roy Richards: "Western Standard Time" b/w The Eagles: "What A Agony"

Here are some missing numbers: (from Pete Smith, Planet Records)

178	FOUR ACES – RIVERBANK COBBERLEY					

179	FOUR ACES – SWING LOW							

182	UPCOMING WILLOWS – JONES TOWN SPECIAL				

185	ERIC MORRIS – MANY LONG YEARS					
			   SUDDENLY						

193	DERRICK & NAOMI – I WANT A LOVER					

195	DON DRUMMOND – TREASURE ISLAND					
	RIOTS – YOU DON’T KNOW							

197	RIOTS – I’M IN LOVE								

198	LAUREL AITKEN – BOOGIE IN MY BONES					
			          LITTLE SHEILA						

201	JOE WHITE & CHUCK – LOW MINDED PEOPLE				

202	DESMOND DEKKER – THIS WOMAN					

203	JACKIE OPEL – COME BACK WHERE YOU BELONG (WIPE THOSE TEARS) 
			   DON’T TAKE AWAY MY LOVE				

204	DON DRUMMOND – COOLIE BOY						

205	DELROY WILSON – PICK UP THE PIECES					
			           OPPRESSION						

207	SKATALITES – BALL O’ FIRE						
	LINVAL SPENCER – CAN’T GO ON						

208	DON DRUMMOND – MAN IN THE STREET					

209	JACKIE OPEL – GO WHEY							

211	PETER TOUCH & THE WALERS – HOOT NANNY HOOT			
					          DO YOU REMEMBER

212	THE WAILERS – HOOLIGANS						
			     MAGA DOG							

216	THE WAILERS – DON’T EVER LEAVE ME					
			     DONNA							

219	PHILIP JAMES – WIDE AWAKE IN A DREAM				

220	KEN LAZARUS – FUNNY
	BYRON LEE & THE DRAGONAIRES – WALK LIKE A DRAGON

221	SONNY BURKE – GRANDPA
	KEITH PATTERSON – DEEP IN MY HEART

222	BLUES BUSTERS – WINGS OF A DOVE					
	BYRON LEE – DAN IS THE MAN

225	DERRICK MORGAN – STARVATION						
				I AM A BLACKHEAD AGAIN				

226	SKATALITES – DICK TRACY							
	RITA & THE SOULETTES – ONE MORE CHANCE				

227	JACKIE OPEL – OLD ROCKING CHAIR					
	SKATALITES – SKA IN VIENNA WOODS					

228	BUNNY & RITA – BLESS YOU						
	SKATALITES – BEARDMAN SKA						

229	BABA BROOKS – GUNS FEVER						
	DOTTY & BONNIE – DON’T DO IT						

230	HORTENSE & ALTON – DON’T GAMBLE WITH LOVE			
	ALTON ELLIS & THE FLAMES - SOMETHING YOU’VE GOT		

233	BABA BROOKS – INDEPENDENCE SKA					
	STRANGER & CLAUDETTE – SEVEN DAYS A WEEK

241 	BABA BROOKS – TEENAGE SKA						
	ALTON ELLIS – YOU ARE NOT TO BLAME

242	DON DRUMMOND – UNIVERSITY GOES SKA				
	DERRICK & NAOMI – PAIN IN MY HEART

243	THEOPHILUS BECKFORD – GRUDGEFUL PEOPLE				
				             YOU ARE THE ONE GIRL

245	DERRICK HARRIOTT – MAMA DIDN’T LIE					
				    TOGETHER

247	THE RIOTS – YEAH YEAH							
	BABA BROOKS – VIRGINIA SKA						

248	THEOPHILUS BECKFORD – BAJAN GIRL					
					WHAT A WOE				

249	TWO KINGS – HIT YOU LET YOU FEEL IT					
			HONEY I LOVE YOU

252	LAUREL AITKEN – HOW CAN I FORGET YOU
	OWEN GRAY – I’M GOING BACK

254	THE WAILERS – WHAT’S NEW PUSSYCAT					
			     WHERE WILL I FIND

255	JACKIE EDWARDS – WHITE CHRISTMAS
				MY LOVE AND I

258 	OWEN GRAY & THE SOUND SYSTEM – YOU DON’T KNOW LIKE I KNOW 
						       TAKE ME SERIOUS

259	ROLANDO ALPHONSO – JAMES BOND					
	LEE PERRY – JUST KEEP IT UP

260	THE WAILERS – JUMBIE JAMBORIE					
	SKATALITES – INDEPENDENT ANNIVERSARY SKA			

261	DAVID ISAACS – SEE THAT MAN						
			     I’D RATHER BE LONELY					

263	AVALONS – EVERYDAY							
		          I LOVE YOU							

264	JACKIE OPEL – A LOVE TO SHARE						
	ROLAND ALPHONSO – DEVOTED TO YOU

266	LORD BRYNNER & THE SHEIKS – CONGO WAR				
					           TEACH ME TO SKA

267	OWEN GRAY – PARADISE							
			 BYE BYE LOVE

270	JACKIE EDWARDS – COME ON HOME					
				SOMETIMES

271	PATSY COLE – DISAPPOINTED BRIDE					
	EARL BOSTIC – HONEYMOON NIGHT

274	JACKIE EDWARDS – L O V E							
			            WHAT’S YOUR NAME

282	SOUL BROTHERS – GREEN MOON						
			           EGAL OK						

283	FITSY & FREDDY – WHY DID YOU DO IT					
	ROY RICHARDS – DOUBLE TROUBLE

287 JACKIE EDWARDS - THINK TWICE

288	DERRICK MORGAN – I FOUND A QUEEN					
	DERRICK & PATSY – IT’S TRUE MY DARLING

289	DERRICK & PATSY – DON’T YOU WORRY					
	DERRICK MORGAN – AMALETIA

292	KING PERRY – DOCTOR DICK						
	SOUL BROTHERS – MAGIC STAR						

293	JACKIE MITTOO – KILLER DILLER						
	PATRICK HYLTON – OH LADY

294	SKATALITES – SKA BOSTELLO						
	DON DRUMMOND – LOOKING THROUGH THE WINDOW			

296	SOUL BROTHERS – SOUND ONE						
	THE MARTINE – GRANDFATHERS CLOCK

Sue 
The Sue label, initiated in 1963, was a subsidiary to release black US-American music. The releases followed the catalogue numbers of Island's singles starting at number 300. The first 17 releases of the British Sue label were in fact related to Henry 'Juggy' Murray's New York based Sue label. Some earlier issues from the black-owned independent American label established in 1957 were released on the London American label. The original Island agreement with the American company ended in disagreement and all (U.S.) Sue records were deleted from their catalogue in July 1965, and American Sue issues returned to the London American label. Island records retained the use of the name Sue until the final release in 1968.
WI 301 - Inez Foxx: "Mockingbird" / "He's The One You Love"
WI 308 - Derak Martin: "Don't Put Me Down Like This"
WI 309 - Ernestine Anderson: "Keep An Eye On Love"
WI 312 - The Soul Sisters: "I Can't Stand It"
WI 323 - Inez Foxx: "Hurt by Love" (UK #40, July 1964)
WI 335 - Elmore James: "Dust My Blues"
WI 337 - Louisiana Red: "I Done Woke Up"
WI 339 - J.B. Lenoir And His African Hunch Rhythm: "I Sing Um The Way I Feel"
WI 340 - Bobby Parker: "Watch Your Step" / "Steal Your Heart Away"
WI 350 - Ike & Tina Turner: "I Can't Believe What You Say"
WI 352 - Betty Everett: "I've Got A Claim On You"
WI 359 - Etta James & The Peaches: "Roll With Me Henry"
WI 361 - John Lee Hooker: "Boogie Chillun"
WI 362 - Irma Thomas: "Don't Mess With My Man"
WI 366 - Frankie Ford: "Sea Cruise" / "Roberta"
WI 374 - Bob & Earl: "Harlem Shuffle"
WI 377 - Donnie Elbert: "A Little Piece Of Leather" / "Do What'cha Wanna"
WI 385 - Little Joe Cook: "Stormy Monday Blues" (Pt. 1/Pt. 2) (the T-Bone Walker song, miscredited)
WI 394 - Gladys Knight & the Pips: "Letter Full Of Tears"

Black Swan 
The Black Swan label was one of Island's first subsidiaries with releases from 1963 to 1965. With a black and white label the catalogue covered the WI series numbers from 401 to 471. From 1970 to 1971 Trojan/B&C Records used the label for records within a BW series. Island reactivated the label in 1976/1977 within the WIP series and with a small series of 12" singles in a BS series.
WI 401 - Laurel Aitken: "Lion Of Judah" b/w "Remember My Darling" (b-side with Cynthia Richards), 1963
WI 402 - Derrick Morgan: "Street Girl" b/w "Edmarine", 1963
WI 403 - Jimmy Cliff: "The Man" b/w "You Are Never Too Old", 1963
WI 404 - Wilfred Jackie Edwards: "Why Make Believe" b/w "Do You Want Me Again", 1963 (b-side with Velvetts)
WI 405 - Delroy Wilson: "Spit In The Sky" b/w "Voodoo Man", 1963
WI 406 - Don Drummond: "Scrap Iron" b/w Dragonaire: "Prevention", 1963
WI 407 - Archibald Trott: "Get Together" b/w "Just Because", 1963
WI 408 - The Melody Enchanters: "Oh Ma, Oh Pa" b/w Top Grant: "Coronation Street", 1963
WI 409 - Roy & Millie: "You Are The Only One" b/w "Cherry, I Love You", 1963
WI 410 - Roy & Millie: "Oh Merna" b/w Don Drummond: "Dog War Bossa Nova", 1963
WI 411 - Laurel Aitken: "The Saint" b/w "Go, Gal, Go", 1963
WI 412 - Baba Brooks: "Jelly Beans" b/w Eric Morris: "Sampson", 1964
WI 413 - Stranger And Ken: "Uno-Dos" / "Look", 1963
WI 414 - Baba Brooks: "Key To The City" / Eric Morris: "Solomon Gondie"
WI 415 - Stranger Cole: "Summer Day" / "Loving You Always"
WI 416 - Wilfred Jackie Edwards: "The Things You Do" / "Little Smile"
WI 417 - Ernest Ranglin & The GB's: "Swing A Ling Part 1" / "Part 2", 1964
WI 418 - Barbara & Winston: "The Dream" / "I Love You", 1964
WI 419 - Winston Samuels: "Luck Will Come My Way" / Lloyd Brevett: "One More Time", 1964
WI 420 - Beltones: "Gloria Love" / Winston Francis: "You Are The One"
WI 421 - Jackie Opel: You're No Good / King Liges
WI 422 - Tommy McCook: Two For One / Lascelles Perkins: I Don't Know
WI 423 - The Vikings: Down By The Riverside / This Way, 1964
WI 425 - Derrick Morgan: Cherry Pie / Bob Walls: Remember Where You're From, 1964
WI 426 - Winston Samuels: You Are The One / Gloria Love, 1964
WI 427 - Roy And Millie: Oh Shirley / Marie, 1964
WI 428 - Vikings: Treat Me Bad / Sitting On Top, 1964
WI 429 - Keith And Enid: Lost My Love / I Cried, 1964
WI 430 - The Maytals: Come Into My parlour / I Am In Love, 1964
WI 431 - Marguerita: Woman Come / Eric Morris: Number One, 1964
WI 432 - Melody Enchanters: Enchanted Ball / Sailor Boy
WI 433 - Eric Morris: Supper In The Gutter / Ambition, 1964
WI 434 - Baba Brooks: Spider / Meldoy Jamboree
WI 435 - Stranger Cole: Boy Blue / Eric Morris: Words Of Wisdom, 1964
WI 436 - Roy And Yvonne: Two Roads / Join Together, 1964
WI 437 - Jimmy James: Thinking Of You / Shirley, 1964
WI 438 - Baba Brooks: Cork Foot / The Hersang Combo: BBC Channel 2
WI 439 - Eric Morris: River Come Down / Eric Morris: Seek And You'll Find, 1964
WI 440 - Shenley Duffas: Digging A Ditch / He's Coming Down, 1964
WI 441 - Bobby Aitken: Jericho / Lester Sterling: Lunch Time
WI 442 - Baba Brooks: Musical Workshop / Duke White: Be Wise
WI 443 - Shenley Duffus: Gather Them In / Crucifixion
WI 444 - Baba Brooks: Bus Strike / Duke White: Sow Good Seeds
WI 445 - Eric Morris: Home Sweet Home / Lester Sterling: 64, 1964
WI 446 - Frank Cosmo: Alone / Beautiful Book
WI 447 - Lloyd Briscoe: Spiritualist Mambo / Baba Brooks: Fly Right, 1964
WI 448 - The Cherry Pies: Do You Keep On Dreaming / Sweeter Than Cherry Pies
WI 449 - Charlie Organaire: Go Home / Theo Beckford: Ungrateful People, 1964
WI 450 - Lloyd Briscoe: My Love Has Come / Baba Brooks: Sweet Eileen
WI 451 - Sonny And Yvonne: Night After Night / Sonny Burke Group: Here We Go Again, 1965
WI 452 - Theophilus Beckford: Take Your Time / Stranger Cole: Happy Go Lucky
WI 453 - Baba Brooks: Take Five / Viney Gale: Go On
WI 454 - Lloyd Briscoe: Trojan / I Am The Least
WI 455 - Desmond Dekker: Dracula / Don Drummond: Spitfire, 1964
WI 456 - Baba Brooks: Dreadnaught / Playgirls: Looks Are Everything, 1964
WI 457 - Sonny Burke: I Love You Still / It's Always A Pleasure, 1965
WI 458 - Sonny Burke: City In The Sky / Everyday I Love You More
WI 459 - Tony Washington: But I Do / D.C.s: Night Train, 1964
WI 460 - Tony Washington: Dilly Dilly / But I Do, 1964
WI 461 - Sonny And Yvonne: Night After Night / Here We Go Again, 1964
WI 462 - Stranger Cole & Patsy: Hey Little Girl / Cornel Campbell: Make Hay, 1965
WI 463 - Lord Creator: Wicked Lady / The Maytals: My Little Ruby, 1964
WI 464 - The Maytals: John And James / Theo Beckford: Sailing On, 1965
WI 465 - Stranger & Ken: I Want To Go Home / Richard Suanders: The Sign Of The Times
WI 466 - Baba Brooks: Baby Elephant Walk / Don Drummond: Don's Special
WI 467 - Marvin And Johnny: Cherry Pie / Ain't That Right, 1965
WI 468 - Joe & Ann: Gee Baby / Wherever You May Be, 1965
WI 469 - Sonny Burke: Glad / Jeanie
WI 470 - Sonny Burke: Dance With Me / My Girl Can't Cook
WI 471 - Sonny Burke: Wicked People / God In Heaven Knows

Jump Up 
Jump Up started in 1963 and released singles mainly in calypso style until ca. 1967. Around 1970 Trojan/B&C continued to release with the label, continuing with both prefix and catalogue numbers. (Tapir's)
JU 501 - Mighty Dougla: Laziest Man / Dance Me Lover
JU 502 - Lord Blakie: Maria / Snakes In The Square
JU 503 - Lord Creator With The Byron Lee Orchestra: Jamaica Jump Up / Laziest Man, 1963
JU 504 - Lord Kitchener: Love In The Cemetery / Jamaican Woman, 1962
JU 505 - Gene Lawrence: Longest Day Meringie / Bachelor Boy
JU 506 - Lord Kitchener: Road / Neighbour, 1967
JU 507 - Mighty Sparrow: Kennedy & Khruschev / The Slave (National Record Co, Trinidad, 1962)
JU 508 - Mighty Dougla: Teacher Teacher / Split Me In Two
JU 509 - Mighty Dougla: Ugliness / My Wicked Boy Child
JU 510 - Gene Lawrence: Longest Day Meringue / Bachelor Boy
JU 511 - Lord Kitchener: Dr. Kitch / Come Back Home Meh Boy (Telco Records, Trinidad, 1963)
JU 512 - Jackie Opel: TV In Jamaica / Worrells Captaincy (Beverleys Jamaica, 1963)
JU 513 - Mighty Dougla: You Wasting Your Time / The Smart Barbadian (Telco Records, Trinidad)
JU 515 - Lord Christo: The Dumb Boy And The Parrot / The General Hospital, 1967
JU 516 - Nap Hepburn: Political Girl / The River
JU 517 - Lord Cristo: Election War Zone / Bad Luck Man, 1967
JU 518 - King Fighter: People Will Talk / Same Thing, 1965
JU 519 - Joey Lewis: Nut Vendor / Marriage Recipe
JU 520 - Ramon Otano: Mambo Trinidad / Fiesta En La Joya
JU 521 - Joey Lewis Band: Oye Mi Son / Yo-No-Se
JU 522 - Lord Blakie: Chinese Restaurant (Curry Shrimp & Rice) / What They Get, They Will Take
JU 523 - Mighty Sparrow: Bull Pistle Gang / Village Ram
JU 524 - Lord Creator: Big Bamboo / Marjorie & Harry
JU 525 - Young Growler: Bulldozer / Clarabel
JU 526 - Young Growler: Pressure In Britain / Pretentious Woman
JU 527 - Lord Nelson: Party For Santa Claus / Stella
JU 528 - Young Growler: Lucy Swimming Pool / Topless Dress
JU 529 - Young Growler: Pussy Galore / Sledgehammer
JU 530 - Lord Kitchener: Kitch You So Sweet / Ain't That Fun, 1967
JU 531 - Baldhead Growler: The Sausage / Bingo Woman, 1967

Aladdin 
Island's "first serious stab at setting up a pukka pop label". Releases were numbered in a WI-6xx series, but the matrix number of Jackie Edwards' "He'll Have To Go" was WI 2000, suggesting that it might have been intended to use that catalogue number series instead.
WI-601 - Jackie Edwards: "He'll Have To Go" b/w "Gotta Learn To Love Again", 1965
WI-602 - unissued
WI-603 - Owen Gray: "Gonna Work Out Fine" b/w "Dolly Baby", 1965
WI-604 - Theo Johnson: "Masters Of War" b/w "Water Is Wide", 1965
WI-605 - Jackie Edwards: "Hush" b/w "I Am In Love With You No More", 1965
WI-606 - Dinah Lee: "I’ll Forgive You Then Forget You" b/w "Nitty Gritty", 1965
WI-607 - Owen Gray: "Linda Lu" b/w "Can I Get A Witness", 1965
WI-608 - Dinah Lee: "I Can’t Believe What You Say" b/w "Pushin’ A Good Thing Too Far", 1965
WI-609 - Prince & Princess: "Ready Steady Go" b/w "Take Me Serious", 1965
WI-610 - unissued
WI-611 - Jackie Edwards: "The Same One" b/w "I Don’t Know", 1965
WI-612 - Lord Kitchener: "Dr Kitch" b/w "Come Back Home Meh Boy", 1965 (reissue)

Brit 
A short-lived subsidiary whose releases came out in the spring of 1965. The handful of releases were numbered in the WI-1000 series.
WI-1001 - Bobby Jameson: "Rum-Pum" b/w "I Want To Know Why", 1965
WI-1002 - Millie: "My Street" b/w "Mixed Up, Fickle, Moody, Self-Centred, Spoiled Kind Of Boy", 1965
WI-1003 - The Cannon Brothers: "Turn Your Eyes To Me" b/w "Don't Stop Now", 1965
WI-1004 - The Anglos: "Incense" b/w "You're Fooling Me", 1965 (A-side allegedly features Stevie Winwood. Disc was later reissued - see WIP-6061)
WI-1005 - Dinah Lee: "I Can't Believe What You Say" b/w "Pushing A Good Thing Too Far" (unissued on Brit label - later issued on Aladdin, see WI-608)

Island (WI 3000 series) 
The catalogue numbers 3000 ff. had been chosen after the first series ended at number 299 and 300 ff. had been used for the Sue label (see above).
WI 3000 - Roy Richards: "South Viet Nam" b/w "You Must Be Sorry I(Vocal)", 1966
WI 3001 - The Wailers: "He Who Feels It Knows It" b/w "Sunday Morning", 1966
WI-3002 - The Gaylads: "Stop Making Love" b/w "They Call Her Dawn", 1966
WI 3003 - The V.I.P.'s: "I Wanna Be Free" b/w "Don't Let It Go", 1966
WI 3004 - unissued
WI 3005 - The Claredonians: "I'll Never Change" b/w "Rules Of Life", 1966
WI 3006 - Jackie Edwards: "I Feel So Bad" b/w "I Don't Want To Be Made A Fool Of", 1966
WI 3007 - Belfast Gypsies: "Gloria's Dream" b/w "Secret Police", 1966
WI 3008 - Robert Parker: "Happy Feet" b/w "The Scratch", 1966
WI 3009 - The Wailers: Let Him Go (Rude Boy Get Bail) / Sinner Man, 1966
WI 3010 - Derrick Morgan: Gather Together Now / Soft Hand Nice, 1966
WI 3011 - Wynder K Frog: Sunshine Superman / Blues For A Frog, 1966
WI 3012 - unissued
WI-3013 - Delroy Wilson: "Dancing Mood" / Soul Brothers: More & More (white+red label), 1966
WI 3015 - Ethiopians: I am Free / Soul Brothers: Shanty Town
WI 3016 - Soul Brothers: Mr. Flint / Too Young To Love, 1966
WI 3017 - Freaks of Nature: People Let's Freak Out / Secret Police (Shadow Crashers), 1966
WI 3018 - Jackie Edwards: Royal Telephone / It's No Secret, 1967
WI 3019 - Joyce Bond: Tell Me What It's All About / Tell Me Right Now, 1967
WI 3020 - Ken Boothe: Train Is Coming / This Is Me, 1966
WI 3021 - unissued
WI 3022 - Gaylads: Don't Say No / Sonny Burke: You Rule My Heart, 1967
WI 3023 - Slim Smith: I've Got Your Number / New Boss, 1967
WI 3024 - unissued
WI 3025 - The Gaylads - No Good Girl / Yes Girl, 1967
WI 3026 - Joe Higgs: I Am The Song (The Prophet) / Worry No More, 1967
WI 3027 - Roy Richards: Rub-A-Dub / The Sharks: Baby Come Home, 1967
WI 3028 - Bobby Aitken: Kiss Bam Bam / Cynthia Richards: How Could I, 1967
WI 3029 - Tony Gregory: Get Out Of My Life / Soul Brothers - Sugar Cane, 1967
WI 3030 - Jackie Edwards: Only A Fool Breaks His Own Heart / The End, 1967
WI 3031 - Buster Brown: My Blue Heaven / Two Women, 1967
WI 3032 - Clarendonians: Shoo Be Doo Be / Sweet Heart Of Beauty, 1967
WI 3033 - Delroy Wilson: Riding For A Fall / Got To Change Your Ways, 1967
WI 3034 - Dudley Sibley: Gun Man / Denzil Thorpe: Monkey Speaks His Mind, 1967
WI 3035 - Ken Boothe: I Don't Want To See You Cry / Baby I Need You, 1967
WI 3036 - The Ethiopians: For You / Soul Brothers: Sound Pressure (white+red label)
WI 3037 - Delroy Wilson: Ungrateful Baby / Roy Richards: Hopeful Village Ska, 1967
WI 3038 - Soul Brothers: Cherry / Soul Junior: Out Of My Mind, 1967
WI 3039 - Soul Brothers: Hi-Life / Delroy Wilson: Close To Me, 1967
WI 3040 - Bob Andy: I've Got To Go Back Home / Sonny Burke: Rudy Girl, 1967
WI 3041 - The Claredonians: You Can't Be Happy / Goodbye Forever, 1967
WI 3042 - Peter Touch: I Am The Toughest / Marcia Griffiths: No Faith, 1967
WI 3043 - The Wailers: Bend Down Low / Freedom Time, 1967
WI 3044 - Chords Five: I Am Only Dreaming / Universal Vegrant, 1967
WI-3045 - The Paragons: "On The Beach" / Tommy McCook: Sweet And Gentle, 1967
WI 3046 - Alton Ellis and the Flames: Cry Tough / Carol With Tommy McCook: Mr. Solo, 1967
WI 3047 - Tommy McCook: 1, 2, 3 Kick / The Treasure Isle Boys: What A Fool, 1967
WI 3048 - Justin Hinds: On A Saturday Night / Save A Bread, 1967
WI 3049 - The Moving Brothers: Darling I Love You / Tommy McCook: Saboo, 1967
WI 3050 - Delroy Wilson: Get Ready / Roy Richards: Port 'O'Jam, 1967
WI 3051 - Winston Samuels: The Greatest / Freddie & Fitsy: Truth Hurts, 1967
WI 3052 - Soul Boys: Blood Pressure / Rita Marley: Come To Me, 1967
WI 3053 - Winston Samuels: I Won't Be Discouraged / Freddie& Fitsy: Why Did My Little Girl Cry, 1967
WI 3054 - Hopeton Lewis: Rock Steady / Cool Collie, 1967
WI 3055 - Hopeton Lewis: Finders Keepers / Roland Alphonso: Shanty Town Curfew, 1967
WI 3056 - Hopeton Lewis: Let Me Come On Home / Hardships Of Life, 1967
WI 3057 - Hopeton Lewis: Run Down / Pick Yourself Up, 1967
WI 3058 - Tartans: Dance All Night / What Can I Do, 1967
WI 3059 - Hopeton Lewis: Let the Little Girl Dance / This Music Got Soul, 1967
WI 3060 - Mighty Vikings Band: Do Re Mi / The Sound Of Music, 1967
WI 3061 - Shadrocks: Go Go Special / Count Down, 1967
WI 3062 - Granville Williams Orchestra: Hi-life / More, 1967
WI-3063 - Derrick Harriott: "The Loser" / Bless You, 1967
WI 3064 - Derrick Harriott: Happy Times / You My Everything, 1967
WI 3065 - Astronauts: Before You Leave / Syncopate, 1967
WI 3066 - Lynn Tait & The Jets: Something Stupid / Blue Tuesday, 1967
WI 3067 - The Paragons: Talking Love / If I Were You, 1967
WI 3068 - Hopeton Lewis: Rock A Shacka / I Don't Want Trouble, 1967
WI 3069 - Leslie Butler: Polonaise Reggae / You Don't Have To Say, 1967
WI 3070 - Roy Shirley: People Rock Steady / Slim Smith & Uniques: Trying Hard To Find A Home, 1967
WI 3071 - Roy Shirley: Musical War / Soul Voice, 1967
WI 3072 - Glen Adams: Silent Lover / I Remember, 1967
WI 3073 - Tomorrow's Children: Bang Bang Rock Steady / Rain Rock Steady, 1967
WI 3074 - Sammy Ismay & Mighty Vikings: Rockitty Fockitty, 1967
WI 3075 - Lynn Taitt & The Jets: I Don't Want To See You Cry / Nice Time, 1967
WI 3076 - Hopeton Lewis: Everybody Rocking / Stars Shining So Bright, 1967
WI 3077 - Derrick Harriott: Walk The Streets / Bobby Ellis: Step Softly, 1967
WI 3078 - Henry Buckley: Thank You Girl / Take Me Back, 1967
WI 3079 - Derrick & Pauline Morgan: Someone / Do You Love Me, 1967
WI 3080 - Alva Lewis: I'm Indebted / Groovers: You've Got To Cry, 1967
WI 3081 - Henry Buckley: I'll Reach The End / Don Tony Lee: Lee's Special, 1967
WI 3082 - Ken Parker: How Could I / Sonny Burke: Choo Choo Train, 1967
WI 3083 - Glen Adams: She / S. Burke: Some Other Time, 1967
WI 3084 - Slim Smith & the Uniques: Gypsy Woman / Ken Rose: Wall Flower, 1967
WI 3085 - Keith & Tex: Tonight / Lynn Tait: You Have Caught Me, 1967
WI 3086 - Slim Smith & the Uniques: Let Me Go Girl / Soulettes: Dum Dum, 1967
WI 3087 - Uniques: Never Let Me Go / Don Lee: Lees Special, 1967
WI 3088 - Rude Boys: Rock Steady Massachusetts / Going Home, 1967
WI 3089 - Derrick Harriott: Solomon / Bobby Ellis & Crystallites: The Emperor, 1967
WI 3090 - Mike Thompson Junior & Jets: Rock Steady Wedding / Flowerpot Bloomers, 1967
WI 3091 - Keith & Tex: Stop That Train / Bobby Ellis & The Crystallies: Feeling Peckish, 1967
WI 3092 - Rudy Mills: Long Story / Bobby Ellis & The Crystallites: Now We Know, 1967
WI 3093 - Paragons: So Depressed / We Were Meant To Be, 1967
WI 3094 - Lloyd & Devon: Red Bum Ball / Derrick Morgan: Conquering Ruler, 1968
WI 3095 - Viceroys: Lip And Tongue / Dawn Penn: When Am I Gonna Be Free, 1968
WI 3096 - Ken Parker: Down Low / Sad Mood, 1968
WI 3097 - Dawn Penn: I'll Never Let You Go / Mark Brown: Brownlow Special, 1968
WI 3098 - Roy Shirley: Thank You / Roy Shirley: Touch Them, 1968
WI 3099 - Delroy Wilson: This Heart Of Mine / Glen Adams: Grab A Girl, 1968
WI 3100 - Glen Adams: Hold Down Miss Winey / Vincent Gordon: Sounds And Soul, 1968
WI 3101 - Derrick Morgan: Gimme Back / Viceroys: Send Requests, 1968
WI 3102 - Nehemia Reid: Family War / Give Me That Love, 1968
WI 3103 - Frank Brown: Some Come, Some Go / Consomates: Do It Now, 1968
WI 3104 - Max Romeo: Put Me In The Mood / My One Girl, 1968
WI 3105 - Ken Parker: Lonely Man / Bunnie Lee: Joy In My Heart, 1968
WI 3106 - Glen Adams: That New Girl / Uniques: Speak No Evil, 1968
WI 3107 - Uniques: Lesson Of Love / Delroy Wilson: Till I Die, 1968
WI 3108 - Roy Shirley: Move All Day / Rollin' Rollin', 1968
WI 3109 - Webber Sisters: My World / Alva Lewis: Lonely Still, 1968
WI 3110 - Sensations: Long Time No See You Girl / Roy Shirley: Million Dollar Baby, 1968
WI 3111 - Max Romeo: Walk Into The Dawn / Dawn Penn: I'll Get You, 1968
WI 3112 - Roy Wilson: Dread Saras / David Brown: All My Life, 1968
WI 3113 - Val Bennett: Jumping With Mr Lee / Roy Shirley: Keep Your Eyes On The Road, 1968
WI 3114 - Uniques: Build My World Around You / Lloyd Clarke - I'll Never Change, 1968
WI 3115 - Pat Perrin: Over You / Lloyd Terrell: Lost Without You, 8/1968
WI 3116 - Lloyd Clarke: Summertime / Val Bennett: Soul Survivor, 8/1968
WI 3117 - Uniques: More Love / Val Bennett: Lovall's Special, 1968
WI 3118 - Roy Shirley: Good Is Better Than Bed / Fantastic Lover, 1968
WI 3119 - Roy Shirley & Uniques: Facts Of Life / Leas Us Not Into Temptation, 1968
WI 3120 - Glen Adams: She's So Fine / Roy Shirley: Girlie, 1968
WI 3121 - Pat Kelly: Somebody's Baby / Bevely Simmons: Please Don't Leave Me, 1968
WI 3122 - Slim Smith & The Uniques: My Conversation / Slim Smith: Love One Another, 1968
WI 3123 - Uniques: The Beautitude / Keith Blake: Time On The River, 1968
WI 3124 - Pat Kelly: Twelfth Of Never / Val Bennett: Caldonia, 1968
WI 3125 - Roy Shirley: If I Did Know / Good Ambition, 8/1968
WI 3126 - Federals: Penny For Your Song / I've Passed This Way Before, 1968
WI 3127 - Delroy Wilson: Once Upon A Time / I Want To Love You, 1968
WI 3128 - Stranger & Gladdy: Love Me Today / Over And Over Again, 8/1968
WI 3129 - Gaylets: Silent River Runs Deep / You're My Kind Of Man, 1968
WI 3130 - Alfred Brown & Melmoth: I Want Someone / Alfred Brown: One Scotch One Bourbon One Beer, 1968
WI 3131 - Joe Higgs: You Hurt My Soul / Lynn Taitt & The Jets: Why Am I Treated So Bad, 1968
WI 3132 - Horatio Soul: Ten White Horses / Angela, 1968
WI 3133 - The Tennors: Ride Your Donkey / I've Got To Get You Off My Mind, 1968
WI 3134 - Ike & Crystallites: Illya Kuryakin / Bobby Ellis & Crystallites: Ann Marie, 1968
WI 3135 - Derrick Harriott: Do I Worry / Bobby Ellis & Crystallites: Shuntlin', 1968
WI 3136 - Bobby Ellis & Crystallites: Dollar A Head / Rudy Mills: I'm Trapped, 8/1968
WI 3137 - Keith & Tex: Hypnotising Eyes / Keith & Tex: Lonely Man, 8/1968
WI 3138 - The Paragons: Memories By The Score / The Number One For Me, 9/1968
WI 3139 - Lynn Taitt And The Jets: Napoleon Solo / Pressure And Slide, 1968
WI 3140 - The Tennors: Copy Me Donkey / Ronnie Davis: The Stage, 8/1968
WI 3141 - The Gaylets: I Like Your World / That Lonely Feeling, 8/1968
WI 3142 - The Versatiles: Someone To Love / Teardrops Falling, 1968
WI 3143 - Natives: Live It Up / Never Break My Heart, 1968
WI 3144 - Lyn Beckford: Combination / Keelynn Beckford: Hey Little Girl, 8/1968
WI 3145 - The Uniques: Girl Of My Dreams / Lester Sterling: Tribute To King Scratch, 8/1968
WI 3146 - Val Bennett: The Russians Are Coming / Lester Sterling: Sir Lee's Whip, 8/1968
WI 3147 - Derrick Harriott: Born To Love You / Ike Bennett & Crystallites: Alfred Hitchcock, 1968
WI 3148 - David Anthony: All Night / David Anthony: Out Of My Mind, 1968
WI 3149 - Noel Brown: Man's Temptation / Heartbreak Girl, 1968
WI 3150 - Errol Dunkley: Once More / I'm Not Your Man, 1968
WI 3151 - Ike B & Crystallites: Try A Little Merriness / Patricia, 1968
WI 3152 - Federals: Shocking Love / By The River, 1968
WI 3153 - Derrick Harriott: Tang! Tang! Festival Song / Ike Bennett & Crystallites: James Ray, 8/1968
WI 3154 - Stranger Cole: Jeboza Macoo / Stranger & Gladdy: Now I Know, 1968
WI 3155 - Charlie Kelly: So Nice Like Rice / Stranger & Gladdy: Over Again, 1968
WI 3156 - The Tennors: Gram-Pa / Romeo Stewart: While I Was Walking, 9/1968
WI 3157 - Jackie Edwards: You're My Girl / Heaven Only Knows, 8/1968
WI 3158 - Lloyd And Johnny Melody: My Argument / Johnny Melody: Foey Man, 1968
WI 3159 - Derrick Morgan: Hold You Jack / One Morning In May, 1968
WI 3160 - D. Tony Lee: It's Reggae Time / Errol Dunkley: The Clamp, 1968

Sue (WI 4000 series) 
WI 4005 - Phil Upchurch Combo: "You Can't Sit Down" (UK #39, May 1966)
WI 4012 - Billy Preston: Billy's Bag, 1966
WI 4018 - The Righteous Brothers: You Can Have Her / Justine, 1966
WI 4028 - Barbara Lynn: Letter To Mommy And Daddy, Jan. 1967
WI 4038 - Barbara Lynn: You'll Lose A Good Thing, April 1967

Island WIP series 
This series commenced in January 1967 and initially ran alongside the existing WI 3000 series (see above). It coincided with the introduction of a new pink label design (chosen, according to label founder and owner Chris Blackwell, "because it created a clear break from our Jamaican years") and the "P" in WIP is variously said to stand for "Pink" or "Progressive", reflecting the fact that this new series was geared towards the new generation of rock/pop acts that Island had begun to accumulate from early 1967 onwards, as well as artists from its traditional roster who were being oriented towards the rock/pop audience, such as Jackie Edwards and Jimmy Cliff. Another change was that releases in the WIP series were normally stereo productions. Major UK top twenty singles' chart success for the label came very early in the WIP series, with WIP-6002 - Traffic's "Paper Sun" (#5, 6/1967), a classic slice of British psychedelia released just in time for the "summer of love", but quite a high proportion of the early WIP-series output was by artists who failed to develop as anticipated (e.g. Hard Meat, The Smoke) or represented one-off licensing deals with artists who never again appeared in the Island listings (e.g. WIP-6001, WIP-6013, etc.). The series continued throughout the 1970s and into the early 1980s (see below).

The first of a series of pink label designs was used for singles WIP-6000 to WIP-6051, inclusive. Sometimes referred to as the "eye" label design, it featured an orange and black elliptical device on the left-hand side of the label which could be said to resemble a grotesque eyeball when viewed sideways. "A" and "B" sides were clearly delineated on this early series of pink label singles, thus: WIP-6050-A (Traffic's "Medicated Goo") and WIP-6050-B (the same band's "Shanghai Noodle Factory").

Beginning with WIP-6052, a new series of matrix numbers was introduced for 7" singles. Henceforward, singles' sides were not usually identified as "A" or "B", but each bore a unique matrix number in a series starting at wipx 1002. The matrix number appeared on the label, usually upside-down directly beneath the main catalogue number. The matrix numbers seem to have been allocated to each release in numerical sequence, irrespective of the actual or proposed release date of the record; thus the two sides of WIP-6056 (Jethro Tull's "Living In The Past" b/w "Driving Song") have matrix numbers wipx 1010 and wipx 1011, respectively. Initially, the new matrix numbers were used in conjunction with the existing "eye" label design, but beginning with releases in June 1969 a new pink label design was introduced, known as the "block" design. The new design continued to feature the "eye" device in plain black enclosed within the push-out centre of the record, but the company name was now written in capital letters within a rectangular black block in the lower part of the label. The first release to feature the new label design appears to have been WIP-6060 and the last to feature the orange-and-black "eye" design WIP-6061, a reissue of "Incense" by the Anglos, which had actually been released the previous month. One or two earlier releases which were evidently still selling were re-pressed with the new design (e.g. WIP-6056, which exists with both the orange-and-black "eye" and the "block" label designs).

Towards the end of 1969, artists signed to Terry Ellis and Chris Wright's Chrysalis management company began to be favoured with a special Chrysalis label design - green with a red Chrysalis butterfly logo. Initially this applied to Jethro Tull and former Tull guitarist Mick Abrahams' band Blodwyn Pig. These early Chrysalis singles were allotted catalogue and matrix numbers in the main Island WIP and wipx series, respectively, and bore the legend "manufactured and distributed by island records basing st london" on the upper circumference of the label. Chrysalis continued to issue singles bearing Island catalogue numbers until Autumn 1971, after which the label broke away completely and began its own series of catalogue numbers in a CHS 2000 series.

WIP-6000 - Owen Gray: "Help Me" b/w "Incense", 14/1/1967
WIP-6001 - Rene & Rene: "Loving You Could Hurt Me So Much" b/w "Little Diamonds", 14/1/1967
WIP-6002 - Traffic: "Paper Sun" b/w "Giving to You", 5/1967 (UK #5, June 1967)
WIP-6003 - Ray Cameron: "Doing My Time" b/w "Getaway, Getaway Car", 1/1967
WIP-6004 - Jimmy Cliff: "Give and Take" b/w "Aim And Ambition", 2/1967
WIP-6005 - The V.I.P.'s: "Straight Down To The Bottom" b/w "In A Dream", 2/1967
WIP-6006 - Wynder K Frog: "Green Door" b/w "Dancing Frog", 2/1967
WIP-6007 - Tim Tam and the Turn-Ons: "Wait A Minute" b/w "Ophelia", 4/1967
WIP-6008 - Jackie Edwards: "Come Back Girl" b/w "Tell Him You Lied", 4/1967
WIP-6009 - Julien Covey and the Machine: "A Little Bit Hurt" b/w "Sweet Bacon", 4/1967
WIP-6010 - Joyce Bond: "Do The Teasy" b/w "Sugar", 4/1967
WIP-6011 - Jimmy Cliff: "I Got A Feeling" b/w "Hard Road To Travel", 5/1967
WIP-6012 - Jackie and Millie: "In a Dream" b/w "Ooh, Ooh", 6/1967
WIP-6013 - The Bill Shepherd Sound: "Whistling Sailor" b/w "March of the Seven Seas", 1967
WIP-6014 - Wynder K Frog: "I'm A Man" b/w "Shook Shimmy And Shake", 6/1967
WIP-6016 - Nirvana: "Tiny Goddess" b/w "I Believe in Magic", 7/1967
WIP-6017 - Traffic: "Hole in My Shoe" b/w "Smiling Phases", 8/1967 (early issues in picture sleeve; UK #2, September 1967)
WIP-6018 - Joyce Bond: "This Train" b/w "Not So With Me", 8/1967
WIP-6019 - Art: "What's That Sound (For What It's Worth)" b/w "Rome Take Away Three", 7/1967
WIP-6020 - Nirvana: "Pentecost Hotel" b/w "Feelin' Shattered", 9/1967
WIP-6021 - Millie Small: "I Am In Love" b/w "You Better Forget", 10/1967
WIP-6022 - Spooky Tooth: "Sunshine Help Me" b/w "Weird", 1/1968
WIP-6023 - The Smoke: "It Could Be Wonderful" b/w "Have Some More Tea", 11/1967
WIP-6024 - Jimmy Cliff: "That's The Way Life Goes" b/w "Thank You", 10/1967
WIP-6025 - Traffic: "Here We Go Round The Mulberry Bush" b/w "Coloured Rain", 11/1967 (first 100,000 in picture sleeve) (UK #8, November 1967)
WIP-6026 - Jackie Edwards: "Julie On My Mind" b/w "If This Is Heaven", 2/1968
WIP-6027 - Kytes: "Running In The Water" b/w "The End Of The Day", 2/1968
WIP-6028 - Peter Sarstedt: "I Must Go On" b/w "Mary Jane", 1/1968
WIP-6029 - Nirvana: "Rainbow Chaser" b/w "Flashbulb", 3/1968 (UK #34, May 1968)
WIP-6030 - Traffic: "No Face, No Name And No Number" b/w "Roamin' Thru' The Gloamin' With 40,000 Headmen", 2/1968 (UK #40, March 1968)
WIP-6031 - The Smoke: "Utterly Simple" b/w "Sydney Gill", 3/1968 (not issued)
WIP-6032 - Dave Mason: "Just For You" b/w "Little Woman", 2/1968
WIP-6033 - Emil Dean: "This Is Our Anniversary" b/w "Lonely Boy", 3/1968
WIP-6034 - Santos Morados: "Tonopah" b/w "Anytime", 3/1968
WIP-6035 - Sarolta: "Open Your Hands" b/w "L.O.V.E.", 4/1968
WIP-6036 - Jackie Edwards & Jimmy Cliff: "Set Me Free" b/w "Here I Come", 6/1968
WIP-6037 - Spooky Tooth: "Love Really Changed Me" b/w "Luther's Groove", 6/1968
WIP-6038 - Nirvana: "Girl In The Park" b/w "C Side In Ocho Rios", 6/1968
WIP-6039 - Jimmy Cliff: "Waterfall" b/w "Reward", 7/1968
WIP-6040 - Soul People: "Hummin'" b/w "Soul Drink", 7/1968
WIP-6041 - Traffic: "You Can All Join In" b/w "Withering Tree", 8/1968 (promo/export issue only - see reference)
WIP-6041 - Traffic: "Feeling Alright?" b/w "Withering Tree", 9/1968
WIP-6042 - Jackie Edwards: "You My Girl" b/w Heaven Only Knows, 1968
WIP-6043 - Sue and Sunny: "Set Me Free" b/w Nirvana Orchestra: "City Of The South", 8/1968
WIP-6043 - Jethro Tull: "A Song for Jeffrey" b/w "One for John Gee", 27/9/1968
WIP-6044 - Wynder K Frog: "Jumpin' Jack Flash" b/w "Baldy", 8/1968
WIP-6045 - Nirvana: "All Of Us (The Touchables)" b/w "Trapeze", 11/1968
WIP-6046 - Spooky Tooth: "The Weight" b/w "Do Right People", 9/1968
WIP-6047 - Fairport Convention: "Meet on the Ledge" b/w "Throwaway Street Puzzle", 12/1968
WIP-6048 - Jethro Tull: "Love Story" b/w "Christmas Song", 29/11/1968 (UK #29, January 1969)
WIP-6049 - Heavy Jelly: "I Keep Singing That Same Old Song" b/w "Blue", 1/1969
WIP-6050 - Traffic: "Medicated Goo" b/w "Shanghai Noodle Factory", 12/1968
WIP-6051 - Joyce Bond: "Ob-La-Di, Ob-La-Da" b/w Joyce Bond Review: "Robin Hood Rides Again", 12/1968
WIP-6052 - Nirvana: "Wings Of Love" b/w "Requiem To John Coltrane", 1/1969
WIP-6053 - Bob & Earl: "Harlem Shuffle" b/w "I'll Keep Running Back", 1/1969 (UK #7, March 1969)
WIP-6054 - Free: "Broad Daylight" b/w "The Worm", March 1969
WIP-6055 - Clouds: "Make No Bones About It" b/w "Heritage", 3/1969
WIP-6056 - Jethro Tull: "Living in the Past" b/w "Driving Song", 2/5/1969 (UK #3, May 1969)
WIP-6057 - Nirvana: "Oh! What a Performance" b/w "Darling Darlane", 5/1969
WIP 6058 - Spooky Tooth: "That Was Only Yesterday" b/w "Oh! Pretty Woman", 1969 (believed not issued in U.K. Dutch picture sleeve issues exist with this catalogue number.)
WIP-6059 - Blodwyn Pig: "Dear Jill" b/w "Sweet Caroline", 5/1969
WIP-6060 - Spooky Tooth: "Son Of Your Father" b/w "I've Got Enough Heartache", 6/1969
WIP-6061 - Anglos: "Incense" b/w "You're Fooling Me", 5/1969
WIP-6062 - Free: "I'll Be Creeping" b/w "Sugar for Mr. Morrison"
WIP-6064 - Fairport Convention: "Si Tu Dois Partir" b/w "Genesis Hall", 7/1969 (UK #21, July 1969)
WIP-6066 - Hard Meat: "Rain" b/w "Burning Up Years", 8/1969
WIP-6067 - Clouds: "Scrapbook" b/w "The Carpenter", 9/1969
WIP 6068 - Jethro Tull: "Bouree" b/w "Fat Man", 1969 (not issued in U.K. French and Belgian issues exist with this catalogue number.)
WIP-6069 - Blodwyn Pig: "Walk On The Water" b/w "Summer Day", 9/1969
WIP 6070 - Jethro Tull: "Sweet Dream" b/w "17", 10/10/1969 (green Chrysalis label) (UK #7, November 1969)
WIP-6071 - King Crimson: "The Court of the Crimson King Part One" b/w "The Court of the Crimson King Part Two", 10/1969
WIP-6072 - Mott The Hoople: "Rock and Roll Queen" b/w "Road To Birmingham", 10/1969

(Series continued under heading Singles in the 1970s, below.)

IEP series 
Four track EPs in the 1960s
IEP 701 - Jackie Edwards: Sacred Hymns Vol. 1, 1966
IEP 702 - Jackie Edwards: Sacred Hymns Vol. 2, 1966
IEP 703 - Dioris Valladares and his Orchestra - Meringue!
IEP 704 - Ernest Ranglin and the G.B's: Just A Little Walk
IEP 705 - Millie and her Boyfriends: Roy - Jackie - Owen, 1963
IEP 706 - The Soul of Ike and Tina Turner (Sue subsidiary)
IEP 707 - Bam & Charlie Hyatt: Live At The State Theatre Kingston Jamaica - Rass!, 1966
IEP 708 - Jackie Edwards - Hush, 1966
IEP 709 - Chris Farlowe - Stormy Monday, 1966
IEP 710 - Early Otis Redding
IEP 711 - Z. Z. Hill / Intentions: Gimmie Gimmie (Sue subsidiary)

LPs of the 1960s 
For LPs the label chose the prefix ILP (meaning: Island Long Player) with a number of three figures beginning with 900, later supplemented by ILPS (meaning: Island Long Player Stereo) to distinguish between Mono and Stereo records. Some records were issued in both forms. For those records in stereo, the catalogue number was changed by adding a fourth figure (e.g.: ILP 970 was the mono equivalent of ILPS 9070).

ILP/ILPS series 
ILP 901 - Keith and Enid: Keith and Enid Sing, 1964
the above was the only Island LP released with a black and silver 'flaming sun' label. All following Island LPs had the white and red 'flaming sun' label. The Sue label LPs were incorporated into the island numerical system, and had the yellow and red 'bow tie' labels.
ILP 902 - The Mighty Sparrow: The Slave, 1964
ILP 903 - Derrick Morgan: Forward March, 1964
ILP 904 - Silver Stars Steel Band: Silver Stars Steel Band, 1964
ILP 905 - Bryon Lee & The Dragonaires: Caribbean Joyride, 1964
ILP 906 - Jackie Edwards: The Most Of Wilfred Jackie Edwards, 1964
ILP 907 - Jimmy McGriff: I've Got A Woman (Sue label), 1964
ILP 908 - Jimmy McGriff: Gospel Time (Sue label), 1964
ILP 909 - Ernest Ranglin: Wranglin''', 1964
ILP 910 - V.A.: This Is Blue Beat, 1964
ILP 911 - Inez and Charlie Foxx: Mockingbird, (Sue label) 1964
ILP 912 - Jackie Edwards: Stand Up For Jesus, 1965
ILP 913 - The Soul Sisters: The Soul Sisters, (Sue label) 1965
ILP 914 - V.A.: The Birth of Ska, 1962 (Unreleased UK version of Treasure Isle LP, White Label only) 
ILP 915 - Ernest Ranglin: Reflections, 1965
ILP 916 - Vagabonds: The Fabulous Vagabonds, 1965
ILP 917 - Huey Piano Smith & The Clowns: Rockin' Pneumonia & The Boogie Woogie Flu, (Sue label) 1965
ILP 918 - Elmore James: The Best of Elmore James, (Sue label) 1965
ILP 919 - V.A.: Pure Blues Vol. 1, (Sue label) 1965
ILP 920 - V.A.: 50 Minutes 24 Seconds Of Recorded Dynamite (Sue label), 1965
ILP 921 - V.A.: We Sing The Blues (Sue Label), 1965
ILP 922 - Larry Williams: On Stage, (Sue label) 1965
ILP 923 - The Blues Busters: Behold, 1965
ILP 924 - Lee Dorsey: The Best of Lee Dorsey, 1965
ILP 925 - V.A.: The Sue Story!, 1965
ILP 926 - Harold McNair: Affectionate Fink, 1965
ILP 927 - Elmore James: Memorial Album, (Sue label) 1965
ILP 928 - Derrick Harriott: The Best Of: Vol. 1, 1965
ILP 929 - Billie Holiday: Last Live Recording, 1965 (UK sleeves printed but album released on Sonet Records)
ILP 930 - V.A.: Ska At The Jamaican Playboy Club, 1966
ILP 931 - Jackie Edwards: Come On Home, 1965/1966
ILP 932 - Charlie Hyatt: Kiss Me Neck, 1966
ILP 933 - Various: The Sue Story Vol. 2, (Sue label) 1966
ILP 934 - V.A.: Soul '66, 1966
ILP 935 - Billy Preston: The Most Exciting Organ Ever (Sue label), ca. 1965
ILP 936 - Jackie Edwards: The Best of Jackie Edwards, 1966
ILP 937 - The Righteous Brothers: In Action, (Sue label), 1966
ILP 938 - V.A.: The Sue Story Vol. 3, (Sue label) 1966
ILP 939 - John Foster: John Foster Sings, 1966
ILP 940 - Jackie Edwards: By Demand, 1966
ILP 941 - Jackie Edwards/Millie Small: Pledging My Love, 1966
ILP 942 - Robert Parker: Barefootin, 1966
ILP 943 - V.A.: Doctor Soul, 1966
ILP 944 - Wynder K Frog: Sunshine Superfrog, 1966
ILP 945 - Various: Pakistani Soul Session, 1966
ILP 946 - Ray Barretto: El Watusi, 1966
ILP 947 - The Settlers: Early Settlers, 1966
ILP 948 - V.A.: Club Ska '67, 1967
ILP 949 - Barbara Lynn: Barbara Lynn Story, 1967
ILP 950 - The Wallace Brothers: Soul Connection, (Sue label) 1967
ILP 951 - Bob & Earl: Harlem Shuffle, (Sue label) 1967

At this point, Island introduced the first of three pink label designs. These next releases had the first pink label, with an orange and black 'eyeball' logo on the left, unless otherwise indicated:

ILP 952 - John Martyn: London Conversation, 1967
ILP 953 - Millie Small: The Best of .., 1967
ILP 954 - V.A.: Dr. Kitch, (only on the red/white label) 1967
ILP 955 - Derrick Harriott: Rock Steady Party, 1967
ILP 956 - V.A.: Club Ska '67, (W.I.R.L.-label) 1967
ILP 957 - Hopeton Lewis: Take It Easy, 1967
ILP 958 - V.A.: Duke Reid's Rock Steady, 1967 (Trojan Records, Orange Label)
ILP 959/ILPS 9059 - Nirvana: The Story of Simon Simopath, 1967
ILP 960/ILPS 9060 - Jackie Edwards: Premature Golden Sands, 1967
ILP 961/ILPS 9061 - Traffic: Mr. Fantasy, 1967
ILP 962 - Jimmy Cliff: Hard Road To Travel, 1967
ILP 963 - Jackie Edwards and Millie Small: The Best Of, Vol. 2, 1967
ILP 964 - V.A.: Club Soul, 1967
ILP 965 - V.A. Club Rock Steady, 1967
ILP 966/ILPS 9066 - V.A.: British Blue-Eyed Soul, 1967
ILP 967 - Art: Supernatural Fairy Tales, 1967
ILP 968 - Joyce Bond: Soul And Ska, 1967
ILP 969 - Lynn Taitt & The Jets: Sounds Rocksteady, 1967
ILP 970/ILPS 9070 - The Spencer Davis Group: The Best Of ..., 1967
ILP 971 - Granville Williams Orchestra: Hi-Life, 1967
ILP 972 - Sonny Burke: The Sounds Of ..., 1967
ILP 973 - (not used)
ILP 974 - Bobby Bland: A Touch Of The Blues, 1967
ILP 975 - O.V. Wright: 8 Men, 4 Women, 1967
ILP 976 - V.A.: The Duke And The Peacock, 1967
ILP 977 - V.A.: Guy Steven's Testament Of Rock And Roll, 1967
ILP 978 - V.A.: Put It On, It's Rock Steady, 1967/68
ILPS 9079 - Spontaneous Music Ensemble: Karyobin Are The Imaginary Birds Said To Live In Paradise, 1968 (Island/Hexagram label)
ILPS 9080 - Spooky Tooth: It's All About, 1968
ILPS 9081 T- Traffic: Traffic, 1968
ILPS 9082 - Wynder K Frog: Out of the Flying Pan, 1968
ILP 983 - Derrick Harriott/The Crystallites: The Best Of ..., 1968
ILP 984 - The Merrymen: Caribbean Treasure Chest, 1968
ILP 985/ILPS 9085 - Jethro Tull: This Was, 1968 (mono withdrawn)
ILP 986 - V.A.: Leaping With Mr. Lee, 1968
ILPS 9087 - Nirvana: All Of Us, 1968
ILPS 9088 - Tramline: Somewhere Down The Line, 1968
ILPS 9089 - Free: Tons of Sobs, 1969;
ILP 990 - Derrick Morgan: Derrick Morgan & Friends, 1969
ILPS 9091 - John Martyn: The Tumbler, 1969
ILPS 9092 - Fairport Convention: What We Did on Our Holidays, 1969
ILP 993 - V.A.: The Unfolding Of The Book Of Life (Volume One), 1969

At this point, monaural releases are discontinued. Releases below this text are in stereophonic only.

ILPS 9094 - V.A.: British Blues Adventures Vol.1, 1969 (France Only)
ILPS 9095 - Tramline: Moves Of Vegetable Centuries, 1969
ILPS 9096 - Bama Winds: Windy, 1969
ILPS 9097 - Traffic: Last Exit, 1969
ILPS 9098 - Spooky Tooth: Spooky Two, 1969
ILPS 9099 - White Noise: An Electric Storm, 1969
ILPS 9100 - Clouds: Scrapbook, 1969  
ILPS 9101 - Blodwyn Pig: Ahead Rings Out, 1969

At this point, Island introduced the second pink label. It is known as the 'black block' label, as it featured a thick, block-like letter i at the bottom, dotted by a black eyeball in the centre of the label. This was very quickly replaced by the third pink label, featuring a small white letter i logo. Due to variations in catalogue number assignation and the actual release dates of the records, there is a small cross-over period between the three pink label designs. The original label designs for the following LPs are detailed in parentheses.

ILPS 9102 - Fairport Convention: Unhalfbricking, 1969 (black block label)
ILPS 9103 - Jethro Tull: Stand Up, 1969 (eyeball label)
ILPS 9104 - Free: Free, 1969 (white i label)
ILPS 9105 - Nick Drake: Five Leaves Left, 1969 (black block label)
ILPS 9106 - Dr. Strangely Strange: "Kip of the Serenes", 1969 (eyeball label)

All following LPs were originally issued on the third pink label, with 'white i' logo.

ILPS 9107 - Spooky Tooth: Ceremony, 1969
ILPS 9108 - Mott the Hoople: Mott the Hoople, 1969
ILPS 9109 - V.A.: British Blues Adventures Vol.2, 1969 (France Only)
ILPS 9110 Q- Quintessence: In Blissful Company, 1969
ILPS 9111 - King Crimson: In the Court of the Crimson King, 1969
ILPS 9112 - Traffic: Best of Traffic, 1969
ILPS 9113 - John & Beverley Martyn: Stormbringer!, 1970
ILPS 9114 - Renaissance: Renaissance, 1969
ILPS 9115 - Fairport Convention: Liege & Lief, 1969

 IWP/IWPS series 
During the same period Island Records released some sampler albums with the prefixes IWP/IWPS':
IWPS 2 - You Can All Join In, 1968
IWP 3 - This Is SueIWPS 4 - Jackie Edwards - Put Your Tears Away 
IWP 5 - This Is BluesIWPS 6 - Nice Enough To Eat, 1969

 UK releases 1970s 

 Singles in the 1970s 

 Island WIP series 
The first release in 1970, WIP-6075, had the "block" label design, but the very next one, "John The Baptist" by John & Beverley Martyn, featured a third pink label design, characterised by a large white letter "i" on the left-hand side. This design was used for the remaining pink label issues, interrupted with increasing frequency by green Chrysalis label releases, as denoted in the listing below. Bronze label singles by artists such as Tony Hazzard and Uriah Heep began to appear in the Island listing from May 1971, for a couple of years until that label's own BRO- series was begun. An American record label, Blue Thumb, also released a small number of UK singles with WIP-series numbers in 1972/3. The one-off catalogue number WI-4002 was given to the flexi-single "Let There Be Drums" which came with the album Rock On by The Bunch in 1972.

In the second half of the decade the character of the label began to change and this is reflected in its singles releases from about 1976 onwards. There was a conscious move back towards the label's roots in Jamaican music in the form of commercial reggae aimed at the rock/pop audience. Names such as Bob Marley & the Wailers, Toots & the Maytals and Third World crop up in the listings with increasing frequency. They and others enjoyed considerable commercial success in the U.K. market. There is evidence too of an increasing number of one-off licensing deals featuring (mainly American) soul and R & B singers (e.g. Barbara Pennington and Betty Davis). Island also joined a growing trend amongst U.K.-based record companies at that time towards exploitation of its own back catalogue, and a substantial programme of reissues was undertaken, especially of ska and reggae titles, most of which seem to have been aimed at a small, specialist audience and did not enjoy widespread commercial success.

Also in 1976, another American record label, Shelter Records, began to issue U.K. singles through Island, which received WIP-series catalogue numbers. Artists included the Dwight Twilley Band, J.J. Cale and Tom Petty & the Heartbreakers, the last-named of whom enjoyed some success on the coat-tails of punk.  Finally, the Black Swan label was reactivated for certain reggae-styled releases, some of which appeared with WIP-series numbers.

(N.B. For reasons of continuity, this section of the discography also includes singles numbered in the WIP 6xxx series which were released between 1980 and 1983.)

WIP-6075 - Quintessence: "Notting Hill Gate" b/w "Move Into The Light", 1/1970 
WIP-6076 - John & Beverley Martyn: "John The Baptist" b/w "The Ocean", 1/1970
WIP 6077 - Jethro Tull: "The Witch's Promise" b/w "Teacher", 16/1/1970 (green Chrysalis label, some in picture sleeve)
WIP 6078 - Blodwyn Pig: "Same Old Story" b/w "Slow Down", 1/1970 (green Chrysalis label)
WIP 6079 - Renaissance: "Island" b/w "The Sea", 1/1970
WIP-6080 - King Crimson: "Cat Food" b/w "Groon", 13/3/1970 (picture sleeve)
WIP 6081 - Jethro Tull: "Inside" b/w "Alive And Well And Living In", 24/4/1970 (green Chrysalis label)
WIP-6082 - Free: "All Right Now" b/w "Mouthful of Grass", 5/1970 (reissued in 1973 with same catalogue number, but "pink rim" labels
WIP 6083 - If: "Raise The Level Of Your Conscious Mind" b/w "I'm Reaching Out On All Sides", 5/1970
WIP 6084 - Spooky Tooth: "Nobody There At All" b/w Art: "Room With A View", 6/1970 (withdrawn, white-label/promo copies exist)
WIP-6085 - Fotheringay: "Peace In The End" b/w "Winter Winds", 6/1970
WIP-6086 - Cat Stevens: "Lady d'Arbanville" b/w "Time/Fill My Eyes", 6/1970 (some in picture sleeve, which miscredits b-side as "Katmandu")
WIP-6087 - Jimmy Cliff: "Wild World" b/w "Be Aware", 8/1970
WIP 6088 - High Broom: "Dancing In The Moonlight" b/w "Percy's On The Run", 8/1970
WIP-6089 - Fairport Convention: "Now Be Thankful" b/w "Sir B. McKenzie's Daughter's Lament For The 77th Mounted Lancers' Retreat From The Straits Of Loch Knombe, In The Year Of Our Lord 1727, On The Occasion Of The Announcement Of Her Marriage To The Laird Of Kinleakie", 9/1970

WIP-6089 was the last single to be released with a pink label. The next single, WIP-6090 was on the Chrysalis label, but from the one after that, WIP 6091, the "pink rim" palm tree label was introduced.

WIP 6090 - Tír na Nóg: "I'm Happy To Be (On This Mountain) b/w Let My Love Grow, 10/1970 (green Chrysalis label)
WIP 6091 - The Alan Bown!: "Pyramid" b/w "Crash Landing", 10/1970
WIP 6092 - Cat Stevens: "Father and Son" b/w "Moon Shadow", 9/1970 
WIP-6093 - Free: "Stealer" b/w "Lying In The Sunshine", 11/1970
WIP 6094 - Not released 
WIP 6095 - Not released 
WIP 6096 - Bronco: "Lazy Now" b/w "A Matter Of Perspective", 11/1970
WIP 6097 - Jimmy Cliff: "Synthetic World" b/w "I Go To Pieces", 12/1970
WIP 6098 - Jethro Tull: "Lick Your Fingers Clean" b/w "Up To Me" (number allocated but not released)
WIP 6099 - Not released 
WIP-6100 - Free: "My Brother Jake" b/w "Only My Soul", 4/1971
WIP 6101 - Mike Heron: "Call Me Diamond" b/w "Lady Wonder", 5/1971 (some in picture sleeve)
WIP-6102 - Cat Stevens: "Tuesday's Dead" b/w "Miles From Nowhere", 9/1971
WIP 6103 - Jimmy Cliff: "Goodbye Yesterday" b/w "Breakdown", 5/1971
WIP 6104 - Richard Barnes: "Coldwater Morning" b/w "Suddenly I Know", 5/1971 (Bronze label)
WIP-6105 - Mott the Hoople: "Midnight Lady" b/w "The Debt", 7/1971 (picture sleeve)
WIP 6106 - Jethro Tull: "Life Is A Long Song" EP ("Life Is A Long Song"/"Up The Pool" b/w "Dr. Bogenbroom"/"From Later"/"Nursie"), 19/9/1971 (green Chrysalis label, picture sleeve)
WIP 6108 - Paladin: "Anyway" b/w "Giving All My Love", 7/1971 (Bronze label)
WIP 6109 - Luther Grosvenor: "Here Comes The Queen" b/w "Heavy Day", 9/1971
WIP 6110 - Jimmy Cliff: "Sitting In Limbo" b/w "The Bigger They Come The Harder They Fall", 8/1971
WIP 6111 - Uriah Heep: "Look At Yourself" b/w "Simon The Bullet Freak", 9/1971 (Bronze label)
WIP-6112 - Mott the Hoople: "Downtown" b/w "Home", 9/1971
WIP 6113 - Tony Hazzard: "Woman In The West" b/w "Hangover Blues", 1971 (Bronze label)
WIP 6115 - Heads Hands & Feet: "Warming Up The Band" b/w "Silver Mine", 11/1971
WIP 6116 - John Martyn: "May You Never" b/w "Just Now", 11/1971
WIP-6119 - Mountain: "Roll Over Beethoven" b/w "Crossroader", 12/1971
WIP-6120 - The Sutherland Brothers Band: "The Pie" b/w "Long Long Day", 1/1972 (picture sleeve)
WIP 6121 - Cat Stevens: "Morning Has Broken" b/w I Want To Live In A Wigwam, 1/1972
WIP 6122 - Claire Hamill: "When I Was A Child" b/w "Alice In The Streets Of Darlington", 1/1972 (picture sleeve)
WIP 6123 - Tony Hazzard: "Blue Movie Man" b/w "Abbot of the Vale", 1/1972 (Bronze label)
WIP 6124 - Luther Grosvenor: "All The People" b/w "Waiting", 2/1972
WIP-6125 - Vinegar Joe: "Never Met A Dog (That Took To Me)" b/w "Speed Queen of Ventura", 2/1972
WIP 6126 - Uriah Heep: "The Wizard" b/w "Gypsy", 3/1972 (Bronze label)
WIP 6127 - Jim Capaldi: "Eve" b/w "Going Down Slow All The Way", 3/1972
WIP-6128 - Fairport Convention: "John Lee" b/w "The Time Is Near", 2/1972 (picture sleeve)
WIP-6129 - Free: "Little Bit Of Love" b/w "Sail On", 5/1972
WIP 6130 - The Bunch: "When Will I Be Loved" b/w "Willie and the Hand Jive", 4/1972
WIP 6131 - Mike McGear: "Woman" b/w "Kill", 4/1972
WIP-6132 - Jimmy Cliff and Jamaica: "Trapped" b/w "Struggling Man", 4/1972
WIP 6133 - Claire Hamill: "Baseball Blues" b/w "Smile Your Blues Away", 5/1972
WIP-6136 - The Sutherland Brothers Band: "Sailing" b/w "Who's Crying Now", 1972
WIP 6138 - Picture sleeve exists bearing this catalogue number with details of the next entry (i.e. Jimmy Cliff: "The Harder They Come" b/w "Many Rivers To Cross") - see http://www.45cat.com/record/wip6139
WIP-6139 - Jimmy Cliff: "The Harder They Come" b/w "Many Rivers To Cross", 7/1972
WIP 6140 - Uriah Heep: "Easy Livin'" b/w "Why", 7/1972 (Bronze label)
WIP-6141 - "Pass of Arms" EP (soundtrack), feat. Sandy Denny: "Here In Silence" b/w "Man Of Iron" plus poem "Strange Meeting" read by Christopher Logue, 9/1972 (picture sleeve)
WIP 6142 - Sandy Denny: "Listen, Listen" b/w "Tomorrow Is a Long Time", 10/1972
WIP 6143 - The Crusaders: "Put It Where You Want It" b/w "Mosadi Woman", 1/1973 (Blue Thumb label)
WIP-6144 - Roxy Music: "Virginia Plain" b/w "The Numberer", 8/1972
WIP-6145 - The Incredible String Band: "Black Jack David" b/w "Moon Hang Low", 11/1972
WIP-6146 - Free: "Wishing Well" b/w "Let Me Show You", 12/1972
WIP 6147 - Sutherland Brothers: "Lady Like You" b/w "Annie", 1972
WIP 6148 - Vinegar Joe: "Rock 'N' Roll Gypsies" b/w "So Long", 11/1972
WIP 6149 - Hackensack: "Moving On" b/w "River Boat", 12/1972
WIP 6151 - P.C. Plod: "W.P.C. Hodges" b/w "B Side Yourself With Plod", 24/11/1972 (die-cut picture sleeve. P.C. Plod was John Gorman of The Scaffold - see next entry.)
WIP 6151 - John Gorman: "W.P.C. Hodges" b/w "I Remember", 11/5/1973 (reissue of previous entry with different b-side)
WIP 6152 - Cat Stevens: "Can't Keep It In" b/w "Crab Dance", 11/1972 (also pressed with later "orange palm" label)
WIP 6153 - Amazing Blondel - "Alleluia (Cantus Firmus To Counterpoint)" b/w "Safety In God Alone", 12/1972
WIP 6154 - Claire Hamill: "Speedbreaker" b/w "The Artist", 2/1973
WIP-6155 - Fairport Convention: "Rosie" b/w "Knights Of The Road", 1/1973
WIP 6156 - Mark Allain: "Be Mine" b/w "Best Friend", 1/1973
WIP-6157 - Sutherland Brothers and Quiver: "(I Don't Want to Love You But) You Got Me Anyway" b/w "Not Fade Away", 2/1973
WIP 6158 - The Incredible String Band: "At The Lighthouse Dance" b/w "Jigs", 2/1973
WIP 6159 - Roxy Music: "Pyjamarama" b/w "The Pride And The Pain", 2/1973
WIP.6160 - Free: "Travellin' In Style" b/w "Easy On My Soul", 3/1973
WIP 6161 - Rabbit: "Broken Arrows" b/w "Blues My Guitar", 4/1973
WIP 6162 - A Foot in Coldwater: "(Isn't Love Unkind) In My Life" b/w "Deep Freeze", 3/1973
WIP 6163 - Cat Stevens: "The Hurt" b/w "Silent Sunlight", 7/1973
WIP 6164 - The Wailers: "Concrete Jungle" b/w "Reincarnation Soul", 6/1973
WIP 6165 - Jim Capaldi: "Tricky Dicky Rides Again" b/w "Oh How We Danced", 6/1973
WIP 6167 - The Wailers: "Get Up, Stand Up" b/w "Slave Driver", 9/1973
WIP 6168 - Spooky Tooth: "All Sewn Up" b/w "As Long As The World Keeps Turning", 10/1973
WIP 6169 - Jimmy Cliff: "Struggling Man" b/w "Many Rivers To Cross", 1973
WIP 6170 - Bryan Ferry: "A Hard Rain's A Gonna Fall" b/w "2HB", 9/1973
WIP 6171 - The Pointer Sisters - "Yes We Can" b/w "Jada", 11/1973 (Blue Thumb label)
WIP.6173 - Roxy Music: "Street Life" b/w "Hula Kula", 11/1973
WIP 6174 - Vinegar Joe: "Black Smoke From The Calumet" b/w "Long Way Round", 10/1973
WIP 6175 - Bryan Ferry: "These Foolish Things" b/w "Chance Meeting" (not issued)
WIP.6176 - Sandy Denny: "Whispering Grass" b/w "Friends", 11/1973 (some in picture sleeve)
WIP.6178 - Eno: "Seven Deadly Finns" b/w "Later On", 3/1974
WIP 6179 - The Heptones: "Book Of Rules" b/w "Book Of Rules (version)", 1973
WIP 6180 - Nirvana: "Rainbow Chaser" b/w "Tiny Goddess" (Reissue - released 8/1976 on the "orange palm" label with picture sleeve in the "Then!.. ...Now!" series. Promo copies on "pink rim" label exist, suggesting that release was originally scheduled for an earlier date.)
WIP 6181 - Zap Pow: "This Is Reggae Music" b/w "Break Down The Barriers", 2/1974
WIP.6182 - Sutherland Brothers and Quiver: "Dream Kid" b/w "Don't Mess Up", 1/1974
WIP 6185 - Owen Gray: "Jealous Guy" b/w "Please Don't Let Me Go", 2/1974
WIP.6186 - Richard and Linda Thompson: "I Want To See The Bright Lights Tonight" b/w "When I Get To The Border", 1/1974
WIP 6187 - Elkie Brooks: "Rescue Me" b/w "Sweet Nuthin's", 2/1974
WIP 6188 - Bob Dylan: "On A Night Like This" b/w "Forever Young", 2/1974
WIP 6189 - King Crimson: "The Night Watch" b/w "The Great Deceiver", 2/1974
WIP.6190 - Cat Stevens: "Oh Very Young" b/w "100 I Dream", 3/1974
WIP 6191 - Bad Company: "Can't Get Enough" b/w "Little Miss Fortune", 5/1974
WIP 6192 - Tranquility: "Midnight Fortune" b/w "One Day Lady", 4/1974
WIP 6193 - Sparks: "This Town Ain't Big Enough For Both Of Us" b/w "Barbecutie", 4/1974
WIP 6194 - Kevin Ayers: "The Up Song" b/w "Everybody's Sometime and Some People's All The Time Blues", 4/1974
WIP 6195 - Sandy Denny: "Like an Old Fashioned Waltz" (release cancelled)
WIP 6196 - Bryan Ferry: "The In Crowd" b/w "Chance Meeting", 5/1974 (picture sleeve)
WIP 6197 - Andy Mackay: "Ride Of The Valkyries" b/w "Time Regained", 6/1974
WIP 6198 - Jim Capaldi: "It's All Up to You" b/w "Whale Meat Again", 6/1974
WIP 6199 - Traffic: "Hole In My Shoe" b/w "Here We Go Round The Mulberry Bush", 5/1974 (reissue)
WIP 6200 - Bryn Haworth: "Grappenhall Rag" b/w "I Won't Lie (This Time)", 1974
WIP 6201 - Kevin Ayers: "After The Show" b/w "Thank You Very Much", 7/1974
WIP 6202 - John Cale: "The Man Who Couldn't Afford To Orgy" b/w "Sylvia Said", 7/1974
WIP 6203 - Sparks: "Amateur Hour" b/w "Lost And Found", 7/1974
WIP 6205 - Bryan Ferry: "Smoke Gets In Your Eyes" b/w "Another Time, Another Place", 8/1974
WIP.6206 - Cat Stevens: "Another Saturday Night" b/w "Home In The Sky", 8/1974 (picture sleeve)
WIP 6207 - Traffic: "Walking In The Wind" b/w "Walking In The Wind (Instrumental)", 10/1974
WIP.6208 - Roxy Music: "All I Want Is You" b/w "Your Application's Failed", 10/1974
WIP.6209 - Sutherland Brothers and Quiver: "Saviour In The Rain" b/w "Silver Sister", 1974
WIP 6211 - Sparks: "Never Turn Your Back On Mother Earth" b/w "Alabamy Right", 10/1974 (picture sleeve)
WIP 6212 - Bob Marley & The Wailers: "So Jah Seh" b/w "Natty Dread", 1974 (reissued 6/1975 and repromoted with "Natty Dread" as the A-side, picture sleeve on reissue only)
WIP 6213 - Georgie Fame: "Everlovin' Woman" b/w "That Ol' Rock'n'Roll", 1974
WIP 6214 - Rik Kenton: "Bungalow Love" b/w "Lay It On You", 1974
WIP 6215 - Bob Dylan & The Band: "It Ain't Me Babe" b/w "All Along The Watchtower", 11/1974
WIP 6216 - Ronnie Lane: "What Went Down (That Night With You)" b/w "Lovely", 11/1974
WIP 6217 - Stonedelight: "Reach Out For Me" b/w "Reach Out For Me (Version)", 1/1975
WIP 6218 - Georgie Fame: "Ali Shuffle" b/w "Round Two", 12/1974
WIP.6220 - Richard and Linda Thompson: "Hokey Pokey (The Ice Cream Song)" b/w "I'll Regret It All In The Morning", 2/1975
WIP.6221 - Sparks: "Something For The Girl With Everything" b/w "Marry Me", 1/1975
WIP 6222 - Milk'n'Cookies: "Little, Lost And Innocent" b/w "Good Friends", 2/1975
WIP 6223 - Bad Company: "Good Lovin' Gone Bad" b/w "Whisky Bottle", 3/1975
WIP 6224 - Art: "What's That Sound (For What It's Worth)" b/w Flying Anchors, 2/1975
WIP 6225 - Chris Spedding: "My Bucket's Got a Hole in It" b/w "I Can't Boogie", 2/1975
WIP 6226 - Augustus Pablo: "King Tubby Meets The Rockers Uptown" b/w Jacob Miller: "Baby I Love You So", 2/1975
WIP 6227 - The Jess Roden Band: "Under Suspicion" b/w "Ferry Cross", 3/1975
WIP 6228 - Dave & Ansil Collins: "Gonna Keep On Trying Till I Win Your Love" b/w "Keep On Dubbing", 3/1975
WIP 6229 - Ronnie Lane's Slim Chance: "Brother Can You Spare A Dime?" b/w "Ain't No Lady", 4/1975
WIP 6230 - Speedy Keen: "Someone To Love" b/w "Fighting In The Streets", 4/1975
WIP 6231 - Pete Wingfield: "Eighteen With a Bullet" b/w "Shadow of a Doubt", 6/1975 (Promo-only picture sleeve. Initial pressings with "pink rim" labels, later pressings with "orange palm" labels)
WIP 6232 - Mike Lesley: "Come Together" b/w "Don't Be So Serious", 5/1975
WIP 6233 - Eno: "The Lion Sleeps Tonight (Wimoweh)" b/w "I'll Come Running (To Tie Your Shoes)", 6/1975
WIP 6234 - Bryan Ferry: "You Go To My Head" b/w "Re-make Re-model", 6/1975
WIP 6235 - Peter Skellern: "Hard Times" b/w "And Then You'll Fall", 7/1975
WIP 6236 - Sparks: "Get In The Swing" b/w "Profile", 7/1975
WIP 6237 - Lorna Bennett: "Breakfast In Bed" b/w Scotty & Lorna Bennett: "Skank In Bed", 1975
WIP 6238 - Cat Stevens: "Two Fine People" b/w "A Bad Penny", 7/1975
WIP 6239 - Rudie Mowatt: "Love You Baby" b/w "Backside (Dub)", 1975
WIP 6240 - Bryn Haworth: "Give All You've Got To Give" b/w "Thank The Lord", 7/1975
WIP 6241 - Fairport Convention: "White Dress" b/w "Tears", 7/1975
WIP 6242 - Bad Company: "Feel Like Makin' Love" b/w "Wild Fire Women", 8/1975
WIP 6243 - Andy Mackay: "Wild Weekend" b/w "Walking The Whippet", 8/1975
WIP 6244 - Bob Marley & The Wailers: "No Woman No Cry" b/w "Kinky Reggae", 8/1975 (initial pressings with "pink rim" labels, later pressings with "orange palm" labels)
WIP 6245 - Pete Wingfield: "A Whole Pot Of Jelly (For A Little Slice Of Toast)" b/w "Anytime", 1975

WIP 6245 is believed to have been the last single released with "pink rim" labels as subsequent releases appeared with the "orange & blue" palm tree label (referred to in this listing as "orange palm").

WIP 6246 - Jim Capaldi: "Love Hurts" b/w "Sugar Honey", 10/1975
WIP 6247 - Speedy Keen: "Bad Boys" b/w "Cold Hand Warm Gun", 9/1975
WIP 6248 - Roxy Music: "Love Is the Drug" b/w "Sultanesque", 9/1975
WIP 6249 - Sparks: "Looks, Looks, Looks" b/w "Pineapple", 9/1975
WIP 6250 - Robert Palmer: "Which Of Us Is The Fool" b/w "Get Outside", 10/1975 (picture sleeve)
WIP 6252 - Murray Head: "Say It Ain't So Joe" b/w "Don't Have To", 10/1975 (A DJ Promo version of this single, featuring an edited version of "Say It Ain't So", was released in 1/1976.)
WIP 6253 - Nasty Pop: "Crow" b/w "Gracie", 1975
WIP 6254 - Joe South: "To Have, To Hold And Let Go" b/w "Midnight Rainbows", 10/1975
WIP 6255 - Betty Davis: "Shut Off The Light" b/w "He Was A Big Freak", 10/1975
WIP 6256 - Third World: "Railroad Track" b/w "Freedom Song", 1975
WIP 6257 - The Chieftains: "The Timpan Reel" b/w "Samhradh, Samhradh", 11/1975
WIP 6258 - Ronnie Lane's Slim Chance: "Don't Try'n'Change My Mind" b/w "Well Well Hello (The Party)", 1/1976
WIP 6260 - Peter Skellern: "Now That I Need You" b/w "I Guess You Wished You'd Gone Home", 1975
WIP 6261 - Justin Hinds & The Dominoes: "Carry Go, Bring Come" b/w "Jezebel", 28/11/1975
WIP 6262 - Roxy Music: "Both Ends Burning" b/w "For Your Pleasure", 12/1975
WIP 6263 - Bad Company: "Run With The Pack" b/w "Do Right By Your Woman", 3/1976
WIP 6264 - Burning Spear: "Old Marcus Garvey" b/w "Tradition", 1/1976
WIP 6265 - Bob Marley & The Wailers: "Jah Live" b/w "Concrete Jungle (live)", 1/1976
WIP 6266 - The Heptones: "Country Boy" b/w "Love Won't Come Easy", 1/1976
WIP 6267 - War: "Low Rider" b/w "So", 1/1976
WIP 6268 - The Chieftains: "Mna Na H Eireann (Women of Ireland)" b/w "The Morning Dew", 1/1976
WIP 6269 - Toots & the Maytals: "Reggae Got Soul" b/w "Dog War", 2/1976
WIP 6270 - Eddie and the Hot Rods: "Writing On The Wall" b/w "Cruisin' (In The Lincoln)", 2/1976
WIP 6271 - Kevin Ayers: "Falling In Love Again" b/w "Everyone Knows The Song", 2/1976
WIP 6272 - Robert Palmer: "Gimme An Inch" b/w "Pressure Drop", 2/1976
WIP 6273 - Jay Dee Bryant: "Standing Ovation For Love" b/w "I Want To Thank You Baby", 1976
WIP 6274 - King Crimson: "21st Century Schizoid Man" b/w "Epitaph", 2/1976 (picture sleeve)
WIP 6275 - Tyrone Taylor: "Extra, Extra" b/w "Life Table Turning", 1976
WIP 6276 - Cat Stevens: "Banapple Gas" b/w "Ghost Town", 3/1976
WIP 6277 - Zap-Pow: "This Is Reggae Music" b/w "Break Down The Barriers", 3/1976
WIP 6278 - Swamp Dogg: "The Mind Does The Dancing While The Body Pulls The Strings" (edited version) b/w (long version), 1976
WIP 6279 - Georgie Fame: "Yes Honestly" b/w "Lily", 3/1976
WIP 6280 - Barbara Pennington: "Running In Another Direction" b/w "Running Away", 1976
WIP 6281 - The Heptones: "Mama Say" b/w "Love Won't Come Easy", 2/1976
WIP 6282 - Sparks: "I Want To Hold Your Hand" b/w "England", 3/1976 (promo only?)This record exists with two different b-sides. Promo copies of both versions advertised for sale on eBay in June 2009
WIP 6282 - Sparks: "I Want To Hold Your Hand" b/w "Under The Table With Her", 1976 (promo only?)
WIP 6283 - Max Romeo & The Upsetters: "War In A Babylon" b/w "Revelation Dub", 3/1976
WIP 6284 - Ken LaRue: "Peepin' Juke Box" b/w "Peepin'", 5/3/1976
WIP 6285 - Jackie Edwards: "Come On Home" b/w "I Feel So Bad", 4/1976
WIP 6286 - The Jess Roden Band: "You Can Leave Your Hat On" b/w "On A Winner With You", 3/1976
WIP 6287 - Eddie Jobson: "Yesterday Boulevard" b/w "On A Still Night", 3/1976
WIP 6289 - War: "Why Can't We Be Friends?" b/w "In Mazatlan", 3/1976
WIP 6290 - Leon Russell: "Tight Rope" b/w "This Masquerade", 1/1977
WIP 6291 - Trevor White: "Crazy Kids" b/w "Movin' In The Right Direction", 6/1976
WIP 6292 - The Dodgers: "Don't Let Me Be Wrong" b/w "Get To You", 4/1976
WIP 6293 - Rock Follies: "Glenn Miller Is Missing" b/w "Talking Pictures", 3/1977
WIP 6294 - Burning Spear: "Black Wa-Da-Da (Invasion) (Dub version)" b/w "I And I Survive (Slavery Days)" (Dub version), 12/3/1976 (Double A-side)
WIP 6295 - Righteous Foundation: "Going Back To Ethiopia Zion" b/w "Zion", 1976
WIP 6296 - Bob Marley & The Wailers: "Johnny Was (Woman Hold Her Head And Cry)" b/w "Cry To Me", 4/1976
WIP 6299 - Jim Capaldi: "Talkin' About My Baby" b/w "Still Talkin'", 4/1976
WIP 6300 - Peter Skellern: "Oh What A Night For Love" b/w "Down In The Cellar", 1976
WIP 6301 - Automatic Man: "My Pearl" b/w "Wallflower", 21/5/1976 (picture sleeve) (An edited version for radio play was also released.)
WIP 6303 - War: "Me and Baby Brother" b/w "In Your Eyes", 6/1976
WIP 6304 - Murray Head: "Someone's Rocking My Dreamboat" b/w "She's Such A Drag", 5/1976 (picture sleeve)
WIP 6305 - Max Romeo & The Upsetters: "One Step Forward" b/w "One Step Dub", 5/1976
WIP 6306 - Eddie and the Hot Rods: "Wooly Bully" b/w "Horseplay (Weary Of The Schmalz)", 6/1976 (picture sleeve)
WIP 6307 - Bryan Ferry: "Let's Stick Together (Let's Work Together)" b/w "Sea Breezes", 28/5/1976
WIP 6308 - Roxy Music: "Do The Strand" b/w "War Brides" (not released)
WIP 6309 - Bob Marley & The Wailers: "Roots Rock Reggae" b/w "Them Belly Full (But We Hungry)", 6/1976
WIP 6310 - Rock Follies: "Sugar Mountain" b/w "War Brides", 6/1976
WIP 6311 - Georgie Fame: "Sweet Perfection" b/w "Thanking Heaven", 6/1976
WIP 6312 - Aswad: "Back To Africa" b/w "Africa", 6/1976
WIP 6313 - Burning Spear: "Man In The Hill", 1976
WIP 6314 - Speedy Keen: "Your Love" b/w "Heaven", 1976
WIP 6315 - War: "Summer" b/w "All Day Music", 8/1976
WIP 6316 - Junior Murvin: "Police and Thieves" b/w "Grumblin Dub", 12/11/1976 (originally intended for release on 9/7/1976)
WIP 6317 - Toots & the Maytals: "Funky Kingston", 1977
WIP 6318 - The Spencer Davis Group: "Gimme Some Loving" b/w "Gimme Some Loving '76", 8/1976 ("Then!.. ...Now!" picture sleeve)
WIP 6319 - Heads Hands and Feet: "Warming Up The Band" b/w "Silver Mine", 1976 ("Then!.. ...Now!" picture sleeve)
WIP 6320 - Bryan Ferry: "The Price Of Love" b/w "Shame Shame Shame", 1976 (Jukebox special issue of two songs from the "Price of Love" EP, IEP 1)
WIP 6321 - Dwight Twilley Band: "I'm On Fire" b/w "Did You See What Happened", 1976 (Shelter label)
WIP 6323 - Peter Tosh: "Legalise It" (not released)
WIP 6324 - Gavin Christopher: "Dance With Me" (not released)
WIP 6325 - Heptones with The Upsetters: "Sufferer's Time" b/w "Sufferer's Dub", 1976
WIP 6326 - Lee Perry: "Roast Fish & Corn Bread" b/w Upsetters: "Corn Fish Dub", 8/1976
WIP 6327 - Justin Hinds & the Dominoes: "Fire" b/w "Natty Take Over", 8/1976
WIP 6328 - Scratch & The Upsetters: "Three In One" b/w "Curly Dub", 8/1976 (Scratch was Lee "Scratch" Perry)
WIP 6330 - Max Romeo: "Chase The Devil" b/w The Upsetters featuring Prince Jazzbo: "Croaking Lizard", 1976
WIP 6331 - Derek and Clive: "Squatter and the Ant" b/w "Sex Crime", 1976
WIP 6332 - Aaron Neville: "Tell It Like It Is" b/w "Been So Wrong", 1976
WIP 6333 - Eddie and the Hot Rods: "96 Tears" b/w "Get Out Of Denver", 9/1976 (Jukebox special issue of two songs from the "Live at the Marquee" EP, IEP 2)
WIP 6334 - Dillinger: "Cokane In My Brain" b/w "Power Bank", 1976
WIP 6335 - Julien Covey & the Machine: "A Little Bit Hurt" (not released)
WIP 6336 - Pete Wingfield: "Bubbling Under" b/w "I Wanna Try", 1976 (edited version of A-side)
WIP 6337 - Sparks: "Big Boy" b/w "Fill 'Er Up", 10/1976
WIP 6338 - Aswad: "Three Babylon" b/w "Ire Woman", 1976
WIP 6339 - J. J. Cale: "Hey Baby" b/w "Magnolia", 10/1976 (Shelter label)
WIP 6340 - War: "The Cisco Kid" b/w "Beetles In The Bog", 9/1976
WIP 6341 - Dwight Twilley Band: "Could Be Love" b/w "Feeling In The Dark", 1976 (Shelter label)
WIP 6342 - The Dodgers: "Just Wanna Love You" b/w "Don't Know What You're Doing", 10/1976 (number originally allotted to The Heptones with The Upsetters: "Party Time" - not issued)
WIP 6344 - Lord Creator: "Big Pussy Sally" b/w The Upsetters: "Big Pussy Dub", 1976
WIP 6345 - Robert Palmer: "Man Smart, Woman Smarter" b/w "From A Whisper To A Scream", 10/1976
WIP 6346 - Burning Spear: "Lion" b/w "Door Peep", 10/1976
WIP 6347 - Bunny Wailer: "Dream Land" b/w "Dream Land Dub", 10/1976
WIP 6350 - Ultravox!: Proposed title unknown (not released)
WIP 6351 - Free: "The Hunter" b/w "Worry", 11/1976
WIP 6352 - Fay Bennett: "Big Cockey Wally" b/w The Upsetters: "Big Cockey Dub", 1976
WIP 6353 - Leroy Smart: "Ballistic Affair" b/w "Ballistic Dub", 1976
WIP 6354 - Eddie and the Hot Rods: "Teenage Depression" b/w "Shake", 11/1976 (picture sleeve)
WIP 6355 - Dillinger: "Bionic Dread" b/w "Eastman Skank", 1976 (Black Swan label)
WIP 6356 - Jah Lion: "Soldier & Police War" b/w Glen DaCosta: "Magic Touch", 1976
WIP 6357 - Sparks: "I Like Girls" b/w "England", 11/1976
WIP 6358 - The Jess Roden Band: "Stay In Bed" b/w "Me And Crystal Eye", 11/1976
WIP 6359 - War: "Slippin' into Darkness" b/w "Nappy Head", 12/1976
WIP 6360 - The Goodies: "Elizabeth Rules UK" b/w "Blowing Off", 10/12/1976
WIP 6361 - The Dodgers: "Down" b/w "Don't Know What You're Doing", 12/1976
WIP 6362 - Rico/I Jah Man: "Gan-jah" (not released)
WIP 6364 - The Heptones: "Party Time" b/w "Deceivers", 1976
WIP 6365 - Leon Russell: "Slipping Into Christmas" b/w "Christmas In Chicago", 31/12/1976 (Shelter label)
WIP 6366 - J. J. Cale: "Travelin' Light" b/w "Cocaine", 1/1977 (Shelter label)
WIP 6370 - Lee Perry & The Upsetters: "Dreadlocks In Moonlight" b/w "Cut Throat", 11/1976
WIP 6371 - Ras Midass: "Kude A Bamba" b/w "Congo Dub", 1976 (Black Swan label)
WIP 6373 - Michael Nesmith: "Rio" b/w "Life, The Unsuspecting Captive", 3/1977
WIP 6374 - Eddie and the Hot Rods: "All I Need Is Money" (not released)
WIP 6375 - Ultravox!: "Dangerous Rhythm" b/w "My Sex", 28/1/1977 (later pressings in picture sleeve)
WIP 6376 - Bob Marley & the Wailers: "Smile Jamaica" (not released)
WIP 6377 - Tom Petty and the Heartbreakers: "American Girl" b/w "The Wild One, Forever", 2/1977 (Shelter label)
WIP 6380 - Dillinger: "Natty B.Sc." b/w "Buckingham Palace", 1977 (Black Swan label)
WIP 6381 - Bad Company: "Everything I Need" b/w "Too Bad", 18/2/1977 (picture sleeve)
WIP 6382 - Keble Drummond & The Cables: "What Kind Of World" b/w "World Of Dub", 1977 (Black Swan label)
WIP 6383 - Jim Capaldi: "Goodbye My Love" b/w "Baby You're Not My Problem", 3/1977
WIP 6384 - Georgie Fame: "Daylight" b/w "Three Legged Mule", 1977 (B-side credited to Georgie Fame & the Blue Flames)
WIP 6385 - John Martyn: "Over The Hill" b/w "Head And Heart", 2/1977
WIP 6386 - Wilton Place Street Band: "Disco Lucy (I Love Lucy Theme)" b/w "You Don't Even Know Who We Are", 1976
WIP 6387 - Cat Stevens: "(Remember The Days Of The) Old School Yard" b/w "The Doves", 3/6/1977 (picture sleeve)
WIP 6388 - Eddie and the Hot Rods: "I Might Be Lying" b/w "Ignore Them (Always Crashing In The Same Bar)", 15/4/1977 (picture sleeve)
WIP 6390 - Bob Marley & The Wailers: "Exodus" b/w "Exodus (Dub)", 6/1977
WIP 6391 - Sandy Denny: "Candle in the Wind" b/w "Still Waters Run Deep", 5/1977
WIP 6392 - Ultravox!: "Young Savage" b/w "Slipaway", 5/1977 (picture sleeve)
WIP 6393 - J.J. Cale: "After Midnight" b/w "Bringing It Back", 5/1977 (Shelter label)
WIP 6394 - Steve Winwood: "Time Is Running Out" b/w "Penultimate Zone", 6/1977
WIP 6395 - Jim Capaldi: "Daughter Of The Night" (not released)
WIP 6396 - Tom Petty and the Heartbreakers: "Anything That's Rock 'n' Roll" b/w "Fooled Again (I Don't Like It)", 6/1977 (Shelter label)
WIP 6397 - Jimmy Cliff: "You Can Get It If You Really Want" b/w "Many Rivers To Cross", 5/1977
WIP 6398 - Michael Nesmith: "Navajo Trail" b/w "Love's First Kiss", 7/1977
WIP 6399 - Rico: "Africa" b/w "Afro Dub", 1977 (Black Swan label)
WIP 6401 - Rods: "Do Anything You Wanna Do" b/w "Schoolgirl Love", 29/7/1977 (picture sleeve)
WIP 6402 - Bob Marley & The Wailers: "Waiting In Vain" b/w "Roots", 7/1977
WIP 6403 - Tom Petty and the Heartbreakers: "American Girl" b/w "Luna", 7/1977 (Shelter label, picture sleeve)
WIP 6404 - Ultravox!: "Rockwrok" b/w "Hiroshima Mon Amour", 10/1977 (picture sleeve)
WIP 6405 - Keith Rowe: "Groovy Situation" b/w "Groovy Dub", 1977 (Black Swan label)
WIP 6406 - Jess Roden: "Misty Roses" b/w "In Me Tonight", 1977
WIP 6407 - Cat Stevens: "Sweet Jamaica" (not released)
WIP 6408 - The Dwight Twilley Band: "Trying To Find My Baby" b/w "Rock And Roll", 1977 (Shelter label)
WIP 6409 - Matthew Moore: "Savannah" b/w "Moondew", 1977 (Shelter label)
WIP 6410 - Bob Marley & the Wailers: "Jamming" b/w "Punky Reggae Party", 12/1977 (picture sleeve)
WIP 6411 - Eddie and the Hot Rods: "Quit This Town" b/w "Distortion May Be Expected", 12/1977 (picture sleeve)
WIP 6413 - Third World: "96º in the Shade" b/w "Human Market Place", 1977 (number originally allotted to Georgie Fame: "To Be A Lover" - not released)
WIP 6414 - John Martyn: "Dancing" b/w "Dealer (version)", 1/1978
WIP 6415 - Grace Jones: "La Vie En Rose" b/w "I Need A Man", 12/1977
WIP 6416 - Dillinger: "Cokane In My Brain" b/w "Buckingham Palace" & "Ragnampiza", 1977 (Black Swan label)
WIP 6417 - Ultravox: "Quirks" b/w "Modern Love (live)", 1977
WIP 6418 - Robin Tyner & the Hot Rods: "Till The Night Is Gone (Let's Rock)" b/w "Flipside Rock", 12/1977
WIP 6419 - Jess Roden: "The Hardest Blow" b/w "Woman Across The Water", 1977
WIP 6420 - Bob Marley & The Wailers: "Is This Love" b/w "Crisis (version)", 2/1978 (picture sleeve)
WIP 6422 - Hi-Tension: "Hi-Tension" b/w "Girl I Betcha", 5/1978
WIP 6423 - Ian Gillan Band: "Mad Elaine" b/w "Mercury High", 1/1978
WIP 6424 - George Faith: "I've Got The Groove" b/w "Opportunity", 1978
WIP 6425 - Robert Palmer: "Every Kinda People" b/w "Keep In Touch", 3/1978
WIP 6426 - Tom Petty & the Heartbreakers: "I Need To Know" b/w "No Second Thoughts", 6/1978 (Shelter label)
WIP 6427 - The Dwight Twilley Band: "Twilley Don't Mind" b/w "Looking For The Magic", 1978 (Shelter label)
WIP 6428 - Steel Pulse: "Ku Klux Klan" b/w "Dub", 1978 (picture sleeve)
WIP 6430 - Illusion: "Madonna Blue" b/w "Everywhere You Go", 1977 (picture sleeve)
WIP 6431 - Jimmy Lindsay: "Easy" b/w "Easy (Dub)", 1977 (12": 12WIP 6431 also includes "Prophecy" by Fabian)
WIP 6433 - Automatics: "Walking With The Radio On" b/w "Watch Her Now" (not released)
WIP 6434 - J.J. Cale: "I'm A Gypsy Man" b/w "Cherry", 2/1978 (Shelter label)
WIP 6436 - Lorna Bennett: "Breakfast In Bed" b/w "Skank In Bed", 10/3/1978 (reissue)
WIP 6437 - The Reaction: "I Can't Resist" b/w "I Am A Case", 6/1978 (picture sleeve)
WIP 6438 - Eddie & the Hot Rods: "Life On The Line" b/w "Do Anything You Wanna Do (live)", 3/1978 (picture sleeve)
WIP 6439 - Automatics: "When The Tanks Roll Over Poland Again" b/w "Watch Her Now", 1978 (picture sleeve)
WIP 6440 - Bob Marley & the Wailers: "Satisfy My Soul" b/w "Smile Jamaica", 5/1978 (picture sleeve)
WIP 6441 - Sheila Hylton: "Don't Ask My Neighbour" b/w "Jam Down Rocker", 1978 (picture sleeve)
WIP 6442 - Julien Covey & the Machine: "A Little Bit Hurt" b/w "Sweet Bacon", 1978 (reissue)
WIP 6445 - Robert Palmer: "Best of Both Worlds" b/w "Where Can It Go?", 21/7/1978 (picture sleeve)
WIP 6445 - Robert Palmer: "Best of Both Worlds" b/w "Best of Both Worlds (Dub)", 9/1978 (promo version of previous entry)
WIP 6446 - Hi Tension: "British Hustle" b/w "Peace On Earth", 8/1978
WIP 6447 - Jimmy Cliff: "Many Rivers To Cross" b/w The Melodians: "Rivers Of Babylon", 6/1978 (picture sleeve)
WIP 6448 - Arthur Louis: "Knockin' On Heaven's Door" b/w "The Dealer", 1978
WIP 6449 - Steel Pulse: "Prodigal Son" b/w "Prodigal Son (Dub)", 6/1978 (picture sleeve)
WIP 6450 - Grace Jones: "Do or Die" b/w "Comme Un Oiseau Qui S'Envoie", 7/1978 (picture sleeve)
WIP 6451 - Zap-Pow: "Let's Fall In Love" b/w "Some Sweet Day", 1978
WIP 6454 - Ultravox: "Slow Motion" b/w "Dislocation", 8/1978 (picture sleeve)
WIP 6455 - Tom Petty & the Heartbreakers: "Listen To Her Heart" b/w "I Don't Know What To Say To You", 9/1978 (Shelter label)
WIP 6456 - Sugar: "Manhattan Fever" b/w "Manhattan", 1978
WIP 6457 - Third World: "Now That We've Found Love" b/w "Night Heat", 9/1978 (picture sleeve)
WIP 6458 - I Jah Man: "Jah Heavy Load (Edited version)" b/w "I'm A Levi (Edited version)", 1978
WIP 6459 - Ultravox: "Quiet Men" b/w "Cross Fade", 10/1978 (picture sleeve)
WIP 6460 - Reaction: "Telling You" b/w "Telling You Part 2", 1978
WIP 6461 - Steel Pulse: "Prediction" b/w "Handsworth Revolution (dub)", 8/1978
WIP 6462 - Hi Tension: "Autumn Love" b/w "Unspoken", 1978
WIP 6464 - Eddie + Hot Rods: "Media Messiahs" b/w "Horror Through Straightness", 1/1979 (picture sleeve)
WIP 6465 - Cat Stevens: "Last Love Song" b/w "Nascimento", 2/1979
WIP 6466 - Cristina: "Disco Clone" b/w "Disco 'O'", 11/1978
WIP 6467 - The Reasons: "Hard Day At The Office" b/w "Bright Baby Eyes", 1978
WIP 6469 - Third World: "Cool Meditation" b/w "Cool Meditation (Part II)", 12/1978
12WIP 6469 - Third World: "Cool Meditation" b/w "Journey To Addis" (12" single)
WIP 6470 - Toots & the Maytals: "Take It From Me" b/w "Premature", 1978
WIP 6472 - Inner Circle: "Everything Is Great" b/w "Wanted Dead Or Alive", 2/1979
WIP 6474 - Eddie + Hot Rods: "Power And The Glory" b/w "Highlands One Hopefuls Two", 3/1979 (picture sleeve)
WIP 6476 - Charlie Dore: "Fear Of Flying" b/w "Sweetheart", 1979 (picture sleeve)
WIP 6477 - Toots & the Maytals: "Famine" b/w "Pass The Pipe", 1978
WIP 6478 - Bob Marley & The Wailers: "Stir It Up" b/w "Rat Race", 1979 (withdrawn and replaced by following entry) 
12WIP 6478 Bob Marley & The Wailers: "Stir It Up (live)" b/w "War" and "No More Trouble" (both live), 1979 (12" single)
WIP 6479 - J.J. Cale: "Katy, Kool Lady" b/w Juan and Maria: "Juarez Blues", 6/1979 (Shelter label)
WIP 6480 - The Dwight Twilley Band: "Out Of My Hands" b/w "Nothing's Ever Gonna Change So Fast", 23/2/1979 (Shelter label, picture sleeve)
WIP 6481 - Robert Palmer: "Bad Case Of Lovin' You (Doctor, Doctor)" b/w "Love Can Run Faster", 5/1979
WIP 6483 - Gibson Brothers: "Cuba" b/w "Club version", 3/1979
WIP 6484 - Phoebe Snow: "Poetry Man" b/w "San Francisco Bay Blues" (Shelter label)
WIP 6485 - Third World: "One Cold Vibe" b/w "Feel A Little Better" (picture sleeve)
WIP 6488 - Inner Circle: "Stop Breaking My Heart" b/w "Sinners", 5/1979
12XWIP 6489 - Hi Tension: "Funktified (long version)" b/w "Latin Inspiration", 1979 (12" single)
WIP 6490 - Steel Pulse: "Sound System" b/w "Crampas Style", 5/1979
WIP 6491 - Marianne Faithfull: "The Ballad Of Lucy Jordan" b/w "Brain Drain", 10/1979
WIP 6493 - Hi Tension: "There's A Reason" b/w "If It Moves You", 1979
WIP 6494 - Linton Kwesi Johnson: "Want Fi Goh Rave" b/w "Reality Poem", 5/1979
WIP 6495 - John Martyn: "Johnny Too Bad" b/w "Johnny Too Bad (instrumental)", 10/1980
WIP 6496 - Third World: "Talk To Me" b/w "Talk To Me (Part 2)", 6/1979 (picture sleeve)
WIP 6498 - Inner Circle: "We 'A' Rockers" b/w "We 'A' Rockers (Part 2)", 1979
WIP 6499 - American Standard Band: "Got What It Takes" b/w "Children's Island", 1979 (picture sleeve)
12XWIP 6500 - Tumblack: "Caraiba" b/w "Invocation", 1979 (picture sleeve)
WIP 6501 - The Jags: "Back Of My Hand" b/w "Double Vision", 6/1979 (picture sleeve)
12XWIP 6502 - Dwight Twilley Band: "Dwight On White" (6-track EP: "I'm On Fire"/"T.V."/"Runaway" b/w "Looking For The Magic"/"Standin' In The Shadow Of Love"/"Sleeping"), 1979 (Shelter label, 12" on white vinyl, picture sleeve)
WIP 6503 - Gibson Brothers: "Ooh! What A Life" b/w "You", 7/1979
WIP 6504 - U.S. of A.: "2-1 (I Bet Ya)" b/w "2-1 (I Bet Ya) Instrumental Version", 1979
WIP 6505 - The Slits: "Typical Girls" b/w "I Heard It Through The Grapevine", 9/1979
WIP 6506 - The B-52's: "Rock Lobster" b/w "Running Around", 7/1979
WIP 6507 - The In Crowd: "Reggae Groove", 1979
WIP 6510 - Bob Marley & The Wailers: "So Much Trouble In The World" b/w "(instrumental)" 11/1979
WIP 6514 - Roland Al & The Soul Brothers: "Phoenix City" b/w "El Pussy Cat", 1979
WIP 6515 - Robert Palmer: "Jealous" b/w "Woman You're Wonderful", 8/1979
WIP 6516 - Randy VanWarmer: "Just When I Needed You Most" b/w "Your Light", 7/1979 (Bearsville label)
WIP 6517 - Lone Ranger: "Barnabas Collins" b/w "Part 2 Dub", 1979
WIP 6518 - Serge Gainsbourg: "Aux Armes Et Caetara" b/w "Daisy Temple", 1979
WIP 6519 - Third World: "Tonight For Me" b/w "Irie Ites", 1979 (picture sleeve)
WIP 6520 - Dan-I: "Monkey Chop" b/w "Roller (Do It) Boogie", 1979
WIP 6521 - J.J. Cale: "Katy, Kool Lady" b/w "Juarez Blues", 8/1979 (Shelter label, picture sleeve) (Reissue of WIP 6479?)
WIP 6522 - Wailing Souls: "Something Funny" b/w Prince Jammy: "Dub Funny Something", 1979
WIP 6523 - Total Eclipse: "You Got The Cooties" b/w "(Song from the book of) Astrology", 9/1979 (Shelter label)
WIP 6524 - The Buggles: "Video Killed the Radio Star" b/w "Kid Dynamo", 9/1979
WIP 6525 - Gibson Brothers: "Que Sera Mi Vida (If You Should Go)" b/w "Heaven", 11/1979
WIP 6526 - Charlie Dore: "Pilot Of The Airwaves" b/w "Falling", 1979
WIP 6527 - The B-52's: "6060-842" b/w "Hero Worship", 9/1979
WIP 6528 - Linton Kwesi Johnson: "Sonny's Lettah (Anti-Sus Poem)" b/w "Iron Bar Dub/Tek Chance/Funny Dub", 9/1979
WIP 6529 - Vivian Weathers: "Just A Game" b/w "Cheat Heart Dub", 1979
WIP 6530 - 4"Be2": "One Of The Lads" b/w "Ummbaba", 1979 (picture sleeve)
WIP 6531 - The Jags: "Woman's World" b/w "Dumb Blonde", 1/1980 (picture sleeve)
WIP 6532 - Sparks: "This Town Ain't Big Enough For The Both Of Us" b/w "Looks, Looks, Looks", 9/1979 (reissue)
WIP 6533 - The Distractions: "It Doesn't Bother Me" b/w "One Way Love", 18/1/1980 (picture sleeve)
12WIP 6534 - Third World: "Story's Been Told" b/w "Always Around", 11/1979 (unreleased on 7", although promotional copies may exist with cat. no. WIP 6534)
WIP 6536 - Randy VanWarmer: "Call Me" b/w "Forever Loving You", 1979 (Bearsville label)
WIP 6537 - Inner Circle: "New Age Music" b/w Music Machine", 7/1980
WIP 6538 - James Vane: "Judy's Gone Down" b/w "Jung Lovers", 9/1979 (picture sleeve))
WIP 6539 - Junior Murvin: "Police and Thieves" b/w Jah Lion: "Soldier And Police War", (12": 12WIP 6539)
WIP 6540 - The Buggles: "Living in the Plastic Age" b/w "Island", 1/1980
WIP 6542 - Marianne Faithfull: "Broken English" b/w "What's The Hurry", 1/1980
WIP 6543 - Suicide: "Dream Baby Dream" b/w "Radiation", 11/1979; (12": 12WIP 6543)
WIP 6544 - Toots & the Maytals: "Chatty, Chatty" b/w "Turn It Up", 1980
WIP 6545 - Brian Briggs: "Nervous Breakdown" b/w "Lifer", 11/1980 (Bearsville label)
WIP 6547 - John Martyn: "Johnny Too Bad" b/w "Johnny Too Bad (Version)", 10/1980
WIP 6549 - Robert Palmer: "Can We Still Be Friends" b/w "Back In My Arms", 11/1979
WIP 6550 - Killing Joke: "Nervous System" b/w "Turn To Red", 11/1979 (Malicious Damage label)
12WIP 6550 - Killing Joke: "Nervous System" b/w "Almost Red" (12" single - see WIP 6550 for 7" version)
WIP 6551 - The B-52's: "Planet Claire" b/w "There's a Moon in the Sky (Called The Moon)", 11/1979 (picture sleeve) (also released as a picture disc with catalogue no. PWIP 6551)
WIP 6554 - Linton Kwesi Johnson: "Di Black Petty Booshwah" b/w "Straight to Madray's Head", 1980
WIP 6555 - Kim Fowley: "1989: Waiting Around For The Next Ten Years" b/w "1987: Lost Like A Lizard In The Show", 1/1980
WIP 6557 - Don Armando's Second Avenue Rhumba Band: "I'm An Indian Too" b/w "Deputy Of Love", 1/1980; (ZE/Island label; 12": 12WIP 6557; reissied 9/1982 with picture sleeve)
WIP 6558 - The Rivits: "Look All You Like" b/w "Multiplay", 8/1980
WIP 6559 - Norma Jean: "High Society" b/w "Hold Me Lonely Boy", 3/1980 (Bearsville label)
WIP 6560 - Cristina: "Is That All There Is?" b/w "Jungle Love", 1/1980 (ZE/Island label; picture sleeve; 12": 12WIP 6560)
WIP 6561 - Gibson Brothers: "Cuba" b/w "Better Do It Salsa", 2/1980
WIP 6562 - Steel Pulse: "Don't Give In" b/w "Don't Give In (Instrumental)", 3/1980
WIP 6563 - Carlos Malcolm & the Afro-Caribs: "Bonanza Ska" b/w Desmond Dekker: "Get Up Edina" / Skatalites: "Beardman Ska", 1980
WIP 6564 - Davitt Sigerson: "I Never Fall In Love" b/w "Cry For Love", 7/1980 (ZE/Island label)
WIP 6568 - The Distractions: "Boys Cry (Where No One Can See Them)" b/w "Paracetamol Paralysis", 1980 (picture sleeve)
WIP 6569 - Cristina: "Is That All There Is?" b/w "Jungle Love", 1980
WIP 6571 - Invisible Man's Band: "All Night Thing" b/w Instrumental, 6/1980
WIP 6572 - Dan-I: "Hidden Valley" b/w "Action", 1980
WIP 6574 - Millie: "My Boy Lollypop" b/w "Oh, Henry" (picture sleeve; also 12": 12WIP 6574)
12WIP 6575 - Aswad: "Rainbow Culture" b/w "Covenant (Dub)", 1980
WIP 6576 - Charlie Dore: "Where To Now" b/w "Fear Of Flying", 1979?
WIP 6577 - Junior Tucker: "One Of The Poorest People" b/w "Strong Love", 1980
WIP 6579 - The B-52's: "Give Me Back My Man" b/w "Strobe Light", 7/1980
WIP 6580 - Justin Hinds & the Dominoes: "Rub Up, Push Up" b/w The Rulers: "Copasetic", 1980
WIP 6581 - Utopia: "Set Me Free" b/w "Umbrella", 3/1980 (Bearsville label)
WIP 6582 - Foghat: "Third Time Lucky" b/w "Somebody's Been Sleepin' In My Bed", 3/1980 (Bearsville label, originally scheduled for release in 1979)
WIP 6584 - The Buggles: "Clean Clean" b/w "Technopop", 3/1980
WIP 6586 - Bernie Tormé: "The Beat", 1980 (3-track EP, p/s on pink vinyl)
WIP-6587 - The Jags: "Party Games" b/w "She's So Considerate", 1980
WIP 6589 - Steel Pulse: "Caught You Dancing" b/w "Caught (dub version)", 5/1980
WIP 6591 - Grace Jones: "A Rolling Stone" b/w "Sinning", 1980
WIP 6592 - Desmond Dekker: "007 (Shanty Town)" b/w Hopeton Lewis: "Cool Collie" / Derrick Morgan: "Judge Dread In Court", (re-issue of 1960s singles)
WIP 6593 - Toots & the Maytals: "Just Like That" b/w "Gone With The Wind", 1980
WIP 6594 - Cat Stevens: "Morning Has Broken" b/w "Moonshadow", 1980
WIP 6595 - King Sounds & Israelites: "Patches" b/w "Happiness", 1980
WIP 6596 - The Ethiopians: "Train To Skaville" b/w Roy Shirley: "Hold Them" and King Perry: "Doctor Dick", 1980
WIP 6597 - Bob Marley & The Wailers: "Zimbabwe" b/w "Survival", 3/1980 (picture sleeve)
12WIP 6598 - Various Artists: "The Secret Policeman's Ball - The Music", 1980
10WIP 6599 - Bob & Earl: "Harlem Shuffle", Owen Gray: "You Don't Know Like I Know", Robert Parker: "Let's Go Baby" b/w Donnie Elbert: "A Little Piece Of Leather", Billy Preston: "Billy's Bag", Righteous Brothers: "Justine", 1980 (Sue label, overall title: "Plundering The Archives Consignment No. 1")
WIP 6601 - U2 "11 O'Clock Tick Tock" b/w "Touch", 1980
WIP 6603 - Bo and the Generals: "Rich Girl" b/w "I Know", 1980
WIP 6609 - Vane: "Glamorous Boys" b/w "Trails of Error", 1980
WIP 6610 - Bob Marley & The Wailers: "Could You Be Loved" b/w "One Drop", 5/1980; Could You Be Loved (12": 12WIP 6610)
WIP 6611 - Randy Vanwarmer: "Whatever You Decide" b/w "Losing Out On Love", 7/1980 (Bearsville label)
WIP 6611 - Junior Tucker: "Some Guys Have All the Luck" b/w "Spinning Around", 9/1980
WIP 6614 - Basement 5: "Silicon Chip" b/w "Chip Butty", 5/1980 (picture sleeve)
WIP 6615 - Robert Parker: "Barefootin'" b/w Julian Covey: "A Little Bit Hurt" and The Anglos: "Incense"
10WIP 6615 - Robert Parker: "Barefootin'", Julian Covey: "A Little Bit Hurt" and THe Soul Sisters: "I Can't Stand It" b/w The Anglos: "Incense", The Righteous Brothers: "Little Latin Lupe Lu" and Inez and Charlie Foxx: "Hurt By Love", 1980 (Sue label, Plundering the Archives Consignment No. 2WIP 6617 - Gibson Brothers: "Mariana" b/w "All I Want Is You", 7/1980
WIP 6619 - Kid Creole & The Coconuts: "Maladie d'Amour", 1980
WIP 6624 - The Buggles: "Elstree" b/w "Johnny on the Monorail", 11/1980
12WIP 6626 - Black Uhuru: "Sinsemilla" b/w "Guess Who's Coming to Dinner", 7/1980
WIP 6629 - Grace Jones: "Private Life" b/w "She's Lost Control", 6/1980 (picture sleeve)
WIP 6630 - U2: "A Day Without Me" b/w "Things To Make And Do", 8/1980
WIP 6631 - The Strand: "Can't Look Back" b/w "Prisoners in Paradise", 1980
WIP 6636 - Papa Michigan and General Smiley: "One Love Jam Down" b/w "Dub Down", 1980
WIP 6638 - Robert Palmer: "Johnny and Mary" b/w "What's It Take", 8/1980 (picture sleeve)
WIP 6640 - Gibson Brothers: "Metropolis" b/w "Because I Love You", 1980
WIP 6641 - Bob Marley & the Wailers: "Three Little Birds" b/w "Every Need Got An Ego To Feed", 8/1980 (Tuff Gong)
WIP 6642 - Invisible Man's Band: "9 X's Out Of Ten" b/w "Love Can't Come Love Has Come", 1980
WIP 6643 - Davitt Sigerson: "Twist" b/w "Mood Piece", 1980 (ZE label)
WIP 6645 - Grace Jones: "The Hunter Gets Captured by the Game (LP version)" b/w "The Hunter Gets Captured by the Game (Part 2)", 9/1980
WIP 6646 - Aswad featuring Tromie and Bami: "Warrior Charge" b/w "Dub Charge", 1980 (Grove Music)
WIP 6650 - The Distractions: "Something for the Weekend" b/w "What's the Use?", 1980
WIP 6651 - Robert Palmer: "Looking for Clues" b/w "In Walks Love Again", 11/1980 (picture sleeve)
12WIP 6651 - Robert Palmer: "Looking for Clues" b/w "Good Care of You" and "Style Kills", 11/1980
WIP 6653 - Bob Marley & The Wailers: "Redemption Song" b/w "Redemption Song" (band version), 10/1980
WIP 6654 - Basement 5: "Last White Christmas" b/w "Traffic Dub", 12/1980
WIP 6655 - Steve Winwood: "While You See A Chance" b/w "Vacant Chair", 12/1980
WIP 6656 - U2: "I Will Follow" b/w "Boy-Girl (live)", 10/1980 (picture sleeve)
WIP 6659 - Gibson Brothers: "Latin America" b/w "Latin America (instrumental version)", 1980
WIP 6663 - Toots and the Maytals: "Monkey Man (Live)" b/w "Hallelujah (Live)", 1980 (picture sleeve, Live at the Palais EP)
WIP 6664 - Brian Briggs: "See You On The Other Side" b/w "Spy Vs Spy", 3/1981 (Bearsville label)
WIP 6665 - The B-52's: "Strobe Light" b/w "Dirty Back Road", 1980 (picturev sleeve)
WIP 6666 - The Jags: "I Never Was A Beachboy" b/w "Tune Into Heaven", 1/1981 (picture sleeve)
WIP 6669 - Marina Del Ray: "I Love A Shark" b/w Sea Chicken: "Lone Shark", 1980
WIP 6670 - Judy Mowatt: "My My People" b/w "Black Woman", 30/1/1981
WIP 6671 - Sheila Hylton: "The Bed's Too Big Without You" b/w "Give Me Your Love", 1981
12WIP 6671 - Sheila Hylton: "The Bed's Too Big Without You (long version)" b/w "Give Me Your Love (long version)", 1981
WIP 6672 - Manu Dibango: "Happy Feeling" b/w "Gore City", 6/2/1981
WIP 6673 - Grace Jones: "Demolition Man" b/w "Warm Leatherette", 2/1981
WIP 6674 - Plastics: "Peace" b/w "Diamond Head", 3/1981 (promo only?)
WIP 6675 - Junior Tucker: "The Kick (Rock On)" b/w Compass Point All Stars: "Peanut Butter", 9/2/1981
WIP 6676 - The Johnny Average Band featuring Nikki Wills: "Ch Ch Cheri" b/w "Gotta Go Home", 1981 (Bearsville label)
WIP 6678 - Robert Palmer: "Not A Second Time" b/w "Woke Up Laughing", 6/1981 (picture sleeve)
WIP 6679 - U2: "Fire" b/w "J.Swallo", 7/1981 (picture sleeve)
WIP 6680 - Steve Winwood: "Spanish Dancer (remix)" b/w "Hold On", 3/1981 (picture sleeve)
WIP 6683 - The Jags: "The Sound Of G-O-O-D-B-Y-E" b/w "The Hurt", 10/4/1981
WIP 6685 - Bunny Wailer: "Dancing Shoes" b/w "Walk The Proud Land", 12/6/1981
WIP 6686 - J.J. Cale: "Carry On" b/w "Cloudy Day", 3/1981 (Shelter label) (Promo copies had DJ suffix to catalogue number.)
WIP 6689 - Jimmy Lindsay: "Easy" b/w "Easy (dub)", 2/1981 (reissue of WIP 6431)
WIP 6691 - Ultravox: "Slow Motion" / "Quiet Men" b/w "Hiroshima Mon Amour", 3/1981 (also issued as a double-pack with catalogue no. DWIP 6691 and additional track "Dislocation")
WIP 6692 - Toots and the Maytals: "Papa Dee Mama Dear" b/w "Dilly Dally", 1981
WIP 6693 - Aswad: "Babylon" b/w "Explode"
WIP 6694 - Tom Tom Club: "Wordy Rappinghood", 1981
WIP 6695 - Black Uhuru: "Sponji Reggae", 1981
WIP 6696 - Grace Jones: "Pull Up To The Bumper"
WIP 6701 - Jah Wobble/Jaki Liebezeit/Holger Czuckay: "How Much Are They?"
12 WIP 6709 - Was (Not Was): "Out Come The Freaks" b/w dub version, 1981 (ZE label)
WIP 6711 - Coati Mundi: "Me No Pop I" b/w "Que Pasa", 1981
WIP 6713 - Material: "Bustin' Out", 1981
WIP 6716 - Was (Not Was): "Wheel me Out"
WIP 6720 - Pete Shelley: "Homosapien" b/w "Keats' Song", 1981 (Genetic label)
WIP 6720 - Pete Shelley: "Homosapien" b/w "Love In Vain", 1982 (reissue with different b-side)
WIP 6725 - Alexei's Midnight Runners: "Pop Up Toasters" b/w The Outer Limits: "Page 3 Girls"/20th Century Coyote: "I'm Evil (Trouble)", 1981
WIP 6733 - U2: "Gloria", 10/1981
WIP 6735 - Tom Tom Club: "Genius Of Love" b/w "Lorelei (Instrumental)", 1981 (picture sleeve; also released as 12" single with catalogue number 12WIP 6735)
WIP 6739 - Grace Jones: "Walking In The Rain"
WIP 6740 - Pete Shelley: "I Don't Know What It Is", 1981
WIP 6750 - Cristina: "Things Fall Apart" b/w "Disco Clone"12": Island 12WIP 6750-A  / UK, 198112": Island 12WIP 6750-B  / UK, 1981WIP 6754 - Robert Palmer: "Some Guys Have All the Luck" b/w "Too Good To Be True", 1981 (also released as picture disc with catalogue number PWIP 6754)
WIP 6756 - Kid Creole & The Coconuts: "I'm A Wonderful Thing, Baby" b/w "Table Manners", 1982 (Ze label, picture sleeve; also released as 12" single with catalogue number 12WIP 6756 and picture disc with catalogue number PWIP 6756)
WIP 6762 - Tom Tom Club: "Under The Boardwalk" b/w "On On On On", 1982
WIP 6764 - Codek: "Tim Toum"
WIP 6765 - J Walter Negro & The Loose Joints: "Shoot The Pump", 1981
WIP 6768 - Alexei Sayle: "'Ullo John! Gotta New Motor?", 1982
WIP 6769 - Cage featuring Nona Hendryx: "Do What Ya Wanna Do", 1982 (Metropolis label)
WIP 6770 - U2: "A Celebration", 3/1982
WIP 6773 - The Members: "Radio" b/w "Can't Stand Up", 1982 (Genetic label)
WIP 6775 - J.J. Cale: "City Girls" b/w "One Step Ahead Of The Blues", 3/1982 (Shelter label)
WIP 6779 - Grace Jones: "The Apple Stretching" b/w "Nipple To The Bottle", 1982
WIP 6785 - Snuky Tate: "He's The Groove"
WIP 6787 - Black Uhuru: "Darkness-Dubness" b/w "Dub of Eglington", 1982 (10" single)
WIP 6793 - Kid Creole & The Coconuts: "Stool Pigeon", 1982
WIP 6797 - Raw Sex Pure Energy: "Stop The War" b/w "Give Sheep A Chance"
WIP 6801 - Kid Creole And The Coconuts: "Annie I'm Not Your Daddy"
WIP 6808 - Sweat Pea Atkinson: "Don't Walk Away" b/w "Dance Or Die", 1982 (Ze label)
10 WIP 6800 - Gregory Isaacs: "Night Nurse", 1982
WIP 6822 - Jah Wobble & Ben Mandelsohn: "Body Music Moliki"
WIP 6826 - King Sunny Ade & His African Beats: "Ja Funmi", 1982
WIP 6830 - Joe Cocker & Jennifer Warnes: "Up Where We Belong" b/w "Sweet Little Woman", 1982
WIP 6833 - Robert Palmer: "Pride", 1982
WIP 6836 - Set The Tone: "Dance Sucker" b/w "Let Loose", 1982
WIP 6837 - Sweat Pea Atkinson: "Someone Could Lose A Heart Tonight"
WIP 6840 - Kid Creole And The Coconuts: "Dear Addy" b/w "No Fish Today/Christmas On Riverside Drive", 1982 ("Christmas In B'Dilli Bay" EP)
WIP 6846 - Peech Boys: "Life Is Something Special (Vocal)" b/w "Life Is Something Special (Special Edition)", 1983
WIP 6848 - U2: "New Year's Day" b/w "Treasure (Whatever Happened To Pete The Chop)", 1/1983
WIP 6849 - Steve Winwood: "Your Silence Is Your Song" b/w "Your Silence Is Your Song (Instrumental)", 6/1983

 IDS/IDJ series 
The IDS prefix stands for Island Disco Sampler. The series was used for pre-releases in the seconds half of the 1970s, white labels. IDJ was a limited edition series for related releases on the colourful Island label.
IDS 19 - Eddy Quansah Disco Sampler (12"-single sided)
IDJ 19 - Eddy Quansah: Che Che Kulu (12")

 IPR series 
These singels were released in the 12" format during 1977 and 1978.
IPR 2002 - Rico: "Dial Africa" / "Dial Dub"
IPR 2006 - Rico: "Ska Wars" / "Ramble"
IPR 2014 - Yamashta Winwood & Shrieve: "Crossing The Line" b/w "Winner/Loser", 1978
IPR 2016 - Rico: "Take Five" / "Soundcheck"
IPR 2030 - Rico: "Children Of Sanchez" b/w "You Really Got Me" / "Midnight In Ethiopia"

 Black Swan label 
Island released in 1976/1977 a small number of 12" "limited edition" singles in a BS series
BS 1 - The Congoes: Congo Man / Congo Man Chant, 1977
BS 2 - George Faith: To Be A Lover / The Upsetters - Rastaman Shuffle, 1977
BS 3 - George Faith: I've Got the Groove / Diana, 1977
BS 4 - George Faith: Midnight Hour / Turn Back The Hands Of Time, 1977
BS 5 - George Faith: All The Love I've Got / So Fine, 1977
BS 6 - Keith Rowe: Groovy Situation / Groovy Dub, 1977
BS 7 - Dillinger: Cocaine In My Brain // Buckingham Palace / Ragnampiza, 1976
BS 8 - Jimmy Lindsay: Easy / Fabian: Prophecy, 1977
BS 9 - Dillinger: Cokane In My Brain (Raggarave Mix)
7BSX 9 - Dillinger - Cokane In My Brain (Remix), 7"

 LPs in the 1970s 

 ILPS series 
Following on from the 1960s releases, LPs were originally released with pink labels featuring the 'white i' logo, except for the two Chrysalis albums (ILPS 9122/3), which had that company's green labels with butterfly logo. Possibly as a result of a pressing plant change, Jethro Tull's Chrysalis album Benefit was also pressed on the pink rim/palm tree Island label sometime between November 1970 (when that label design went into use) and July 1973 (when Tull's first four albums, including Benefit, were reissued in the Chrysalis CHR 1000 LP series).

Until late 1970 Island LPs were pressed by Polydor. Pressing was then switched to EMI Records before, in late 1975, moving to an unknown, budget manufacturer. EMI pressings can be identified by type-printed Matrix/catalogue numbers pressed into the spare vinyl around the label, whilst later pressings have hand written matrix numbers around label and tend to be pressed on lighter weight vinyl.

ILPS 9116 - Traffic: John Barleycorn Must Die, 1970
ILPS 9117 - Spooky Tooth: The Last Puff, 1970
ILPS 9118 - Cat Stevens: Mona Bone Jakon, 1970
ILPS 9119 - Mott the Hoople: Mad Shadows, 1970
ILPS 9120 - Free: Fire and Water, 1970
ILPS 9121 - not issued
ILPS 9122 - Blodwyn Pig: Getting To This, 1970 (Label: Chrysalis)
ILPS 9123 - Jethro Tull: Benefit, 1970 (Label: Chrysalis)
ILPS 9124 - Bronco: Country Home, 1970
ILPS 9125 - Fotheringay: Fotheringay, 1970
ILPS 9126 - McDonald & Giles: McDonald and Giles, 1970
ILPS 9127 - King Crimson: In the Wake of Poseidon, 1970
ILPS 9128 - Quintessence: Quintessence, 1970
ILPS 9129 - If: If, 1970
ILPS 9130 - Fairport Convention: Full House, 1970

The pink label was replaced by the 'pink rim/palm tree' label at this point, but there was a small cross-over period. At the same time, Island changed its main pressing plants from those of Polydor to EMI.

ILPS 9131 - The Alan Bown: Listen, 1970 (pink rim/palm tree label)
ILPS 9132 - Emerson, Lake & Palmer: Emerson, Lake & Palmer, 1970 (pink label)
ILPS 9133 - John and Beverley Martyn: The Road to Ruin, 1970 (pink label)
ILPS 9134 - Nick Drake: Bryter Layter, 1970 (pink rim/palm tree label)
ILPS 9135 - Cat Stevens: Tea for the Tillerman, 1970 (pink label)

From this point, all Island releases featured the pink rim/palm tree label. ILPS series albums on the Blue Thumb, Bronze and Chrysalis labels used those labels' designs.

ILPS 9136 - Amazing Blondel: Evensong, 1971
ILPS 9137 - If: If 2, 1971
ILPS 9138 - Free: Highway, 1970
ILPS 9139 - Renaissance: Illusion, 1971 (not released in the *UK)
ILPS 9140 - The Incredible String Band: Be Glad for the Song Has No Ending, 1971
ILPS 9141 - King Crimson: Lizard, 1971
ILPS 9142 -Uriah Heep: ...Very 'Eavy ...Very 'Umble, 1971 (Label: Bronze; - original on Vertigo, 1970)
ILPS 9143 - Quintessence: Dive Deep, 1971
ILPS 9144 - Mott the Hoople: Wild Life, 1971
ILPS 9145 - Jethro Tull: Aqualung, 1971 (Label: Chrysalis)
ILPS 9146 - Mike Heron: Smiling Men with Bad Reputations, 1971
ILPS 9147 - Mick Abrahams: A Musical Evening with Mick Abrahams (Label: Chrysalis), 1971
ILPS 9148 - Mountain: Nantucket Sleighride, 1971
ILPS 9149 - Heads Hands & Feet: Heads Hands & Feet, 1971
ILPS 9150 - Paladin: Paladin (Label: Bronze), 1971
ILPS 9151 - Clouds: Watercolour Days  (Label: Chrysalis), 1971
ILPS 9152 - Uriah Heep: Salisbury, 1971 (Label: Bronze; re-issue, Original on Vertigo)
ILPS 9153 - Tír na nÓg: Tír na nÓg (Label: Chrysalis), 1971
ILPS 9154 - Cat Stevens: Teaser and the Firecat, 1971
ILPS 9155 - Emerson, Lake & Palmer: Tarkus, 1971
ILPS 9156 - Amazing Blondel: Fantasia Lindum, 1971
ILPS 9157 - Juicy Lucy: Get a Whiff of This, (Label: Bronze), 1971 
ILPS 9158 - Procol Harum: Broken Barricades (Label: Chrysalis), 1971
ILPS 9159 - Jimmy Cliff: Another Cycle, 1971
ILPS 9160 - Free: Free Live!, 1971
ILPS 9161 - Bronco: Ace of Sunlight, 1971
ILPS 9162 - Fairport Convention: Angel Delight, 1971
ILPS 9163 - The Alan Bown Set: Stretching Out, 1971
ILPS 9164 - War: War, 1971
ILPS 9165 - Sandy Denny: The North Star Grassman and the Ravens, 1971
ILPS 9166 - Traffic: Welcome to the Canteen, 1971 (Credited on labels and cover to Steve Winwood, Jim Capaldi, Dave Mason, Chris Wood, Rick Grech, "Reebop" Kwaku Baah, Jim Gordon; with the Traffic symbol, but not the band name)
ILPS 9167 - John Martyn: Bless the Weather, 1971
ILPS 9168 - Luther Grosvenor: Under Open Skies, 1971
ILPS 9169 - Uriah Heep: Look at Yourself  (Label: Bronze), 1971
ILPS 9170 - Mike Harrison: Mike Harrison, 1971
ILPS 9171 - War: The World Is a Ghetto, 1971
ILPS 9172 - The Incredible String Band: Liquid Acrobat as Regards the Air, 1971
ILPS 9173 - Colosseum: The Collector's Colosseum (Label: Bronze), 1971
ILPS 9174 - Tony Hazzard: Loadwater House, (Label: Bronze), 1971
ILPS 9175 - King Crimson: Islands, 1971
ILPS 9176 - Fairport Convention: "Babbacombe" Lee, 1971
ILPS 9177 - War: All Day Music, 1971 (catalogue number originally assigned to Emerson, Lake & Palmer: Pictures at an Exhibition, the LP of which was released as HELP 1, but the 8-track of "Pictures..." was released as Y8I 9177)
ILPS 9178 - Mott the Hoople: Brain Capers, 1971
ILPS 9179 - Mountain: Flowers of Evil (Live/Studio), 1971
ILPS 9180 - Traffic: The Low Spark of High Heeled Boys, 1971
ILPS 9181 - Sutherland Brothers: The Sutherland Brothers Band, 1972
ILPS 9182 - Claire Hamill: One House Left Standing, 1972
ILPS 9183 - Vinegar Joe: Vinegar Joe, 1972
ILPS 9184 - Nick Drake: Pink Moon, 1972
ILPS 9185 - Heads Hands & Feet: Tracks, 1972
ILPS 9186 - Emerson, Lake & Palmer: Trilogy, 1972
ILPS 9186 - Toots & the Maytals: Funky Kingston, 1972
ILPS 9187 - Jim Capaldi: Oh How We Danced, 1972
ILPS 9188 - Kossoff, Kirke, Tetsu and Rabbit: Kossoff, Kirke, Tetsu and Rabbit, 1972
ILPS 9189 - The Bunch: Rock On, 1972
ILPS 9190 - Paladin: Charge! (Label: Bronze), 1972
ILPS 9191 - Mike McGear: Woman, 1972
ILPS 9192 - Free: Free at Last, 1972
ILPS 9193 - Uriah Heep: Demons and Wizards (Label: Bronze), 1972; 
ILPS 9194 - War: Deliver the World, 1972
ILPS 9195 - not issued
ILPS 9196 - Dick Heckstall-Smith: A Story Ended (Label: Bronze), 1972
ILPS 9197 - Richard Thompson: Henry the Human Fly, 1972
ILPS 9198 - Smith-Perkins-Smith: Smith-Perkins-Smith, 1972
ILPS 9199 - Mountain: Mountain Live: The Road Goes Ever On, 1972

 ILPS 92.. 
ILPS 9200 - Roxy Music: Roxy Music, 1972
ILPS 9201 - The Persuasions: Street Corner Symphony, 1972 (Label: Blue Thumb)
ILPS 9202 - Soundtrack/V.A.: Jimmy Cliff In The Harder They Come, 1972
ILPS 9203 - Dave Mason: Headkeeper (Label: Blue Thumb), 1972
ILPS 9204 - Dan Hicks & The Hot Licks: Striking It Rich (Label: Blue Thumb), 1972
ILPS 9205 - Amazing Blondel: England, 1972
ILPS 9206 - Cat Stevens: Catch Bull at Four, 1972
ILPS 9207 - Sandy Denny: Sandy, 1972
ILPS 9208 - Fairport Convention: Rosie, 1972
ILPS 9209 - Mike Harrison: Smokestack Lightning, 1972
ILPS 9210 - Patto: Roll 'em Smoke 'em Put Another Line Out, 1972
ILPS 9211 - The Incredible String Band: Earthspan, 1972
ILPS 9212 - The Sutherland Brothers: Lifeboat, 1972
ILPS 9213 - Uriah Heep: The Magician's Birthday (Label: Bronze), 1972
ILPS 9214 - Vinegar Joe: Rock & Roll Gypsies, 1972
ILPS 9215 - Mott the Hoople: Rock and Roll Queen, 1972
ILPS 9216 - not issued
ILPS 9217 - Free: Heartbreaker, 1972
ILPS 9218 - The Crusaders: The Crusaders, 1972 (Label: Blue Thumb)
ILPS 9219 - Phil Upchurch: Darkness Darkness (2LP, Label: Blue Thumb), 1972
ILPS 9220 - Tempest: Tempest  (Label: Bronze), 1972
ILPS 9221 - Mike Moran: Fair Warning (Label: Bronze), 1973
ILPS 9222 - Tony Hazzard: Was That Alright Then (Label: Bronze), 1972
ILPS 9223 - Ken Hensley: Proud Words on a Dusty Shelf, (Label: Bronze), 1973
ILPS 9224 - Traffic: Shoot Out at the Fantasy Factory, 1973
ILPS 9225 - Claire Hamill: October, 1973
ILPS 9226 - John Martyn: Solid Air, 1973
ILPS 9227 - Spooky Tooth: You Broke My Heart So I Busted Your Jaw, 1973
ILPS 9228 - Stomu Yamashta: Soundtrack From "The Man From The East", 1973
ILPS 9229 - Incredible String Band: No Ruinous Feud, 1973
ILPS 9230 - King Crimson: Larks' Tongues in Aspic, 1973
ILPS 9231 - Toots & the Maytals: In The Dark, 1974
ILPS 9232 - Roxy Music: For Your Pleasure, 1973
ILPS 9233 - Sharks: First Water, 1973
ILPS 9234 - The Scaffold: Fresh Liver, 1973
ILPS 9235 - Jimmy Cliff: Struggling Man, 1973
ILPS 9236 - Mountain: The Best of Mountain, 1973
ILPS 9237 - Morning Glory: Morning Glory, 1973
ILPS 9238 - Rabbit: Broken Arrows, 1973
ILPS 9239 - not issued
ILPS 9240 - Cat Stevens: Foreigner, 1973
ILPS 9241 - The Wailers: Catch a Fire, 1973 (Original flip-top "cigarette lighter" cover credited to "The Wailers", later band photo cover credited to "Bob Marley and The Wailers")
ILPS 9242 - Stomu Yamashta: Freedom Is Frightening, 1973
ILPS 9243 - The Pointer Sisters: The Pointer Sisters (Label: Blue Thumb), 1973
ILPS 9244 - McGuinness Flint: Rainbow  (Label: Bronze), 1973
ILPS 9245 - Uriah Heep: Sweet Freedom, (Label: Bronze), 1973
ILPS 9246 - Fairport Convention: Nine, 1973
ILPS 9247 - not issued (The Albion Country Band; material later released as HELP 25 in 1976/Battle of the Field)
ILPS 9248 - Grimms: Rockin' Duck, 1973
ILPS 9249 - Bryan Ferry: These Foolish Things, 1973
ILPS 9250 - The Meters: Cissy Strut, 1974
ILPS 9251 - V.A.: This Is Reggae Music, 1973
ILPS 9252 - Roxy Music: Stranded, 1973
ILPS 9253 - John Martyn: Inside Out, 1973
ILPS 9254 - Jim Capaldi: Whale Meat Again, 1974
ILPS 9255 - Spooky Tooth: Witness, 1973
ILPS 9256 - The Wailers: Burnin', 1973
ILPS 9257 - Blondel: Blondel, 1973
ILPS 9258 - Sandy Denny: Like an Old Fashioned Waltz, 1973
ILPS 9259 - Sutherland Brothers & Quiver: Dream Kid, 1973
ILPS 9260 - Butts Band: The Butts Band (Label: Blue Thumb), 1973
ILPS 9261 - Bob Dylan: Planet Waves, 1974
ILPS 9262 - Vinegar Joe: Six Star General, 1973
ILPS 9263 - Kevin Ayers: The Confessions of Dr. Dream and Other Stories, 1974
ILPS 9264 - Paul Kossoff: Back Street Crawler, 1973
ILPS 9265 - Manfred Mann's Earth Band: Solar Fire (Label: Bronze), 1973
ILPS 9266 - Richard & Linda Thompson: I Want to See the Bright Lights Tonight, 1974
ILPS 9267 - Tempest: Living In Fear, (Label: Bronze), 1974
ILPS 9268 - Brian Eno: Here Come the Warm Jets, 1973
ILPS 9269 - Stomu Yamashta: One By One, 1974
ILPS 9270 - The Incredible String Band: Hard Rope & Silken Twine, 1974
ILPS 9271 - Sharks: Jab In Your Eye, 1974
ILPS 9272 - Sparks: Kimono My House, 1974
ILPS 9273 - Traffic: When the Eagle Flies, 1974
ILPS 9274 - Cat Stevens: Buddha and the Chocolate Box, 1974
ILPS 9275 - King Crimson: Starless and Bible Black, 1974
ILPS 9276 - The Pointer Sisters: That's A Plenty (Label: Blue Thumb), 1974
ILPS 9277 - not issued
ILPS 9278 - Andy Mackay: In Search of Eddie Riff, 1974 (reissued in 1975 with different track listing, but same catalogue number. 1975 version only one released in North America)
ILPS 9279 - Bad Company: Bad Company, 1974
ILPS 9280 - Uriah Heep: Wonderworld (Label: Bronze), 1974
ILPS 9281 - Bob Marley & The Wailers: Natty Dread, 1974
ILPS 9282 - Prelude: After the Gold Rush (North America edition and title of Dawn Records album Dutch Courage), 1974
ILPS 9283 - not issued
ILPS 9284 - Bryan Ferry: Another Time, Another Place, 1974
ILPS 9285 - Fairport Convention: Fairport Live Convention, 1975 (Called "A Moveable Feast" in North America)
ILPS 9286 - Jess Roden: Jess Roden, 1974
ILPS 9287 - Bryn Haworth: Let the Days Go By, 1974
ILPS 9288 - Sutherland Brothers & Quiver: Beat of the Street, 1974
ILPS 9289 - Rabbit: Dark Saloon, 1974
ILPS 9290 - Jade Warrior: Floating World, 1974
ILPS 9291 - Kevin Ayers, John Cale, Brian Eno and Nico: June 1, 1974, 1974
ILPS 9292 - Spooky Tooth: The Mirror, 1974  (for North America, issued in the UK as Goodear EAR 2001)
ILPS 9293 - Georgie Fame: Georgie Fame, 1974
ILPS 9294 - Robert Palmer: Sneakin' Sally Through the Alley, 1974
ILPS 9295 - not issued
ILPS 9296 - John Martyn: Sunday's Child, 1974
ILPS 9297 - The Heptones: Book Of Rules, 1974
ILPS 9298 - Peter Cook & Dudley Moore: Good Evening 1974
ILPS 9299 - Swamp Dogg: Have You Heard This Story, 1975

 ILPS 93.. 
ILPS 9300 - New World Electronic Chamber Orchestra: Switched On Beatles, 1974
ILPS 9301 - John Cale: Fear, 1974
ILPS 9302 - McGuinness Flint: C'est La Vie, (Label: Bronze), 1974
ILPS 9303 - Roxy Music: Country Life, 1974
ILPS 9304 - Bad Company: Straight Shooter, 1975
ILPS 9305 - Richard & Linda Thompson: Hokey Pokey, 1974
ILPS 9306 - Manfred Mann's Earth Band: The Good Earth (Label: Bronze), 1974
ILPS 9307 - Ken Hensley: Eager to Please (1975) (Label: Bronze), 1974
ILPS 9308 - King Crimson: Red, 1974
ILPS 9309 - Brian Eno: Taking Tiger Mountain, 1974
ILPS 9310 - Cat Stevens: Greatest Hits, 1975
ILPS 9311 - Nico: The End..., 1974
ILPS 9312 - Sparks: Propaganda, 1974
ILPS 9313 - Fairport Convention: Rising for the Moon, 1975
ILPS 9314 - Gene Pitney: Pitney '75, (Label: Bronze), 1975
ILPS 9315 - Phil Manzanera: Diamond Head, 1975
ILPS 9316 - King Crimson: USA (Live), 1975
ILPS 9317 - John Cale: Slow Dazzle, 1975
ILPS 9318 - Jade Warrior: Waves, 1975
ILPS 9319 - Stomu Yamashta: Raindog, 1975
ILPS 9320 - Milk and Cookies: Milk and Cookies, 1975
ILPS 9321 - Ronnie Lane & Slim Chance: Ronnie Lane's Slim Chance, 1975
ILPS 9322 - Kevin Ayers: Sweet Deceiver, 1975
ILPS 9323 - Franco Battiato: Clic, 1975
ILPS 9324 - The Pasadena Roof Orchestra, 1974
ILPS 9325 - White Lightning: White Lightning, 1975
ILPS 9326 - Blackfoot: No Reservation, 1975
ILPS 9327 - V.A.: This Is Reggae Music Vol. 2, 1975
ILPS 9328 - Joe South: Midnight Rainbow, 1975
ILPS 9329 - Betty Davis: Nasty Gal, 1975
ILPS 9330 - Toots & the Maytals: Funky Kingston, 1975
ILPS 9331 - Fania All-Stars: The Fania All-Stars, 1975
ILPS 9332 - Bryn Haworth: Sunny Side Of The Street, 1975
ILPS 9333 - Pete Wingfield: Breakfast Special, 1975
ILPS 9334 - The Chieftains: Chieftains V, 1975
ILPS 9335 - Uriah Heep: Return to Fantasy (Label: Bronze), 1975
ILPS 9336 - Jim Capaldi: Short Cut Draw Blood, 1975
ILPS 9337 - Manfred Mann's Earth Band: Nightingales and Bombers (Label: Bronze), 1975
ILPS 9338 - Speedy Keen: Y'know Wot I Mean, 1975
ILPS 9339 - not issued
ILPS 9340 - Nasty Pop: Nasty Pop, 1975
ILPS 9341 - not issued
ILPS 9342 - David Byron: Take No Prisoners, 1975
ILPS 9343 - John Martyn: Live at Leeds, 1975
ILPS 9344 - Roxy Music: Siren, 1975; Collectable Records.ru
ILPS 9345 - Sparks: Indiscreet, 1975
ILPS 9346 - Bad Company: Run with the Pack, 1976; Collectable Records.ru
ILPS 9347 - Murray Head: Sooner Or Later (Say It Ain't So), 1975
ILPS 9348 - Richard & Linda Thompson: Pour Down Like Silver, 1975
ILPS 9349 - Jess Roden: Keep Your Hat On, 1976
ILPS 9350 - John Cale: Helen of Troy, 1975
ILPS 9351 - Brian Eno: Another Green World, 1975
ILPS 9352 - Peter Skellern: Hard Times, 1975
ILPS 9353 - Mike Gibbs: Only Chrome Waterfall Orchestra (Label: Bronze), 1975
ILPS 9354 - Paco de Lucia: Paco, 1975
ILPS 9355 - Osibisa: Welcome Home (Label: Bronze), 1975
ILPS 9356 - Colosseum II: Strange New Flesh (Label: Bronze), 1976
ILPS 9357 - Manfred Mann's Earth Band: The Roaring Silence (Label: Bronze), 1976
ILPS 9358 - Sutherland Brothers & Quiver: Sailing, 1976
ILPS 9359 - Mike Harrison: Rainbow Rider, 1976 (Cat. no. assigned - recording issued on 'Goodear Records - EAR 7002)
ILPS 9360 - The Wild Tchoupitoulas: Wild Tchoupitoulas, 1976
ILPS 9361 - Jorge Ben: Samba Nova, 1976
ILPS 9362 - Rock Follies: Rock Follies, 1976
ILPS 9363 - not issued
ILPS 9364 - The Chieftains: The Chieftains 1, 1976
ILPS 9365 - The Chieftains: The Chieftains 2, 1976
ILPS 9366 - Ronnie Lane & Slim Chance: One for the Road, 1976
ILPS 9367 - Bryan Ferry: Let's Stick Together, 1976; Collectable Records.ru
ILPS 9368 - Spooky Tooth: Best of Spooky Tooth, 1976
ILPS 9369 - Third World: Third World, 1976
ILPS 9370 - Cat Stevens: Numbers (album), 1975; Collectable Records.ru
ILPS 9371 - not issued
ILPS 9372 - Robert Palmer: Pressure Drop, 1975
ILPS 9373 - not issued
ILPS 9374 - Toots & the Maytals: Reggae Got Soul, 1976
ILPS 9375 - Uriah Heep: Best of Uriah Heep (Label: Bronze), 1975
ILPS 9376 - Bob Marley & The Wailers: Live At The Lyceum, 1976; Collectable Records.ru
ILPS 9377 - Burning Spear: Marcus Garvey, 1975
ILPS 9378 - War: Why Can't We Be Friends?, 1976
ILPS 9379 - The Chieftains: The Chieftains 3, 1976
ILPS 9380 - The Chieftains: Women Of Ireland (The Chieftains 4), 1976
ILPS 9381 - The Heptones: Night Food, 1976
ILPS 9382 - Burning Spear: Garvey's Ghost, 1976
ILPS 9383 - Bob Marley & The Wailers: Rastaman Vibration, 1976
ILPS 9384 - Uriah Heep: High and Mighty (Label: Bronze), 1976
ILPS 9385 - Dillinger: CB 200, 1976
ILPS 9386 - Jah Lion: Colombia Colly, 1976
ILPS 9387 - Stomu Yamashta / Steve Winwood / Michael Shrieve: Go, 1976
ILPS 9388 - Bob Marley - Rastaman Vibration
ILPS 9389 - Fairport featuring Dave Swarbrick: Gottle O'Geer, 1976 (original UK credit - credited to "Fairport Convention" in North America)
ILPS 9390 - Jorge Ben: Tropical, 1976
ILPS 9391 - V.A.: This Is Reggae Music Vol. 3, 1976
ILPS 9392 - Max Romeo: War Ina Babylon, 1976
ILPS 9393 - Jade Warrior: Kites, 1976
ILPS 9394 - Kabaka - Son Of Africa
ILPS 9395 - High Cotton - High Cotton
ILPS 9396 - Osamu Kitajima - Benzaiten
ILPS 9397 - Automatic Man: Automatic Man, 1976
ILPS 9398 - Gavin Christopher: Gavin Christopher, 1976
ILPS 9399 - Aswad: Aswad, 1976

 ILPS 94.. 
ILPS 9400 - Roxy Music: Viva!, 1976
ILPS 9401 - ILPS 9410 - not issued
ILPS 9411 - Osibisa: Ojah Awake, (Label: Bronze) 1976
ILPS 9412 - Burning Spear: Man In The Hills, 1976
ILPS 9413 - War: Greatest Hits, 1977
ILPS 9414 - Jimmy Cliff: Jimmy Cliff (Erstveröff. 1969), 1976
ILPS 9415 - Bunny Wailer: Blackheart Man, 1976
ILPS 9416 - Justin Hinds: Jezebel, 1976
ILPS 9417 - Upsetters: Super Ape, 1976
ILPS 9418 - not issued
ILPS 9419 - James Montgomery Band: James Montgomery Band, 1976
ILPS 9420 - Robert Palmer: Some People Can Do What They Like, 1976
ILPS 9421 - Richard Thompson: Live (More or Less), 1976
ILPS 9422 - David Pritchard: Nocturnal Earthworm Stew/Bouillabaisse Nocturne Aux Vers De Terre, 1976
 ILPS 9424 - Various Artists (Allen Toussaint / Earl King / Robert Parker / Professor Longhair): New Orleans - Jazz and Heritage Festival 1976 , 1976
ILPS 9425 - Michael Nesmith: Compilation, 1977
ILPS 9426 - Osamu Kitajima: Osamu, 1977
ILPS 9427 - not issued
ILPS 9428 - Michael Nesmith: The Prison, 1977
ILPS 9429 - Automatic Man: Visitors, 1977
ILPS 9430 - not issued
ILPS 9431 - Burning Spear: Dry & Heavy, 1977
ILPS 9432 - The Chieftains: Bonapartes Retreat, 1977
ILPS 9433 - Sandy Denny: Rendezvous, 1977
ILPS 9434 - Derek and Clive: Peter Cook & Dudley Moore Present Derek & Clive, 1976
ILPS 9435 - ILPS 9438 - not issued
ILPS 9439 - Michael Nesmith: And the Hits Just Keep on Coming, 1977; (originally released by another label in 1972)
ILPS 9440 - Michael Nesmith: Pretty Much Your Standard Ranch Stash, 1977; (originally released by another label in 1973)
ILPS 9441 - Bad Company: Burnin' Sky, 1977
ILPS 9442 - Jess Roden: Play It Dirtz Play It Class, 1977
ILPS 9443 - Third World: 96 Degrees In The Shade, 1977
ILPS 9444 - 801 - 801 Live, 1976
ILPS 9445 - Sparks: Big Beat, 1976
ILPS 9446 - Eddie Quansah: CheCheKule, 1977
ILPS 9447 - Fania All Stars: Delicate And Jump, 1976
ILPS 9448 - not issued
ILPS 9449 - Ultravox: Ultravox!, 1977
ILPS 9450 - American Standard Band (1979)
ILPS 9451 - Cat Stevens: IzitsoILPS 9452 - The Goodies: Nothing to Do with Us, 1976
ILPS 9453 - Free: Free 'n Easy, Rough 'n Ready, 1977
ILPS 9454 - Booker Little - The Legendary Quartet Album, 1977
ILPS 9455 - Dillinger: Bionic Dread (Black Swan label), 1976; Tapir's Reggae Discography
ILPS 9456 - The Heptones: Party Time, 1977
ILPS 9457 - Eddie and the Hot Rods: Teenage Depression, 1976
ILPS 9458 - not issued
ILPS 9459 - John Cale: Guts, 1977
ILPS 9460 - Heron: Diamond Of Dreams, 1977
ILPS 9461 - Klaus Schulze: Mirage, 1977
ILPS 9462 - Kaleidoscope: When Scopes Collide, 1976
ILPS 9463 - not issued
ILPS 9464 - Max Romeo: Reconstruction, 1977
ILPS 9465 - ILPS 9469 - not issued
ILPS 9470 - Grace Jones: Portfolio, 1977
ILPS 9471 - not issued
ILPS 9472 - not issued
ILPS 9473 - not issued
ILPS 9474 - Roomful Of Blues: Roomful Of Blues, 1977
ILPS 9475 - not issued
ILPS 9476 - Robert Palmer: Double Fun, 1978
ILPS 9477 - not issued
ILPS 9478 - Brian Eno: Before And After Science, 1977
ILPS 9479 - ILPS 9482 - not issued
ILPS 9483 - Uriah Heep: Firefly (Label: Bronze), 1977
ILPS 9484 - John Martyn: So Far So Good, 1977
ILPS 9485 - Rico: Man From Wareika, 1977
ILPS 9486 - Michael Nesmith: From a Radio Engine to the Photon Wing (Label: Pacific Arts), 1977 (Catalogue number in North America was ILPA 9486)
ILPS 9487 - Georgie Fame: Daylight, 1977
ILPS 9488 - Paco De Lucia: Almoraima, 1977
ILPS 9489 - Illusion: Out of the Mist, 1977
ILPS 9490 - Rough Diamond: Rough Diamond, 1977
ILPS 9491 - Reebop Kwaku Baah & Ganoua: Trance, 1977
ILPS 9492 - John Martyn: One World, 1977
ILPS 9493 - Sparks: The Best Of Sparks, 1977
ILPS 9494 - Steve Winwood: Steve Winwood, 1977
ILPS 9495 - not issued
ILPS 9496 - Jess Roden: Blowin´ (Live), 1977
ILPS 9497 - Jim Capaldi: Play It by Ear, 1977
ILPS 9498 - Bob Marley & The Wailers: Exodus, 1977
ILPS 9499 - Junior Murvin: Police and Thieves, 1977

 ILPS 95.. 
ILPS 9500 - Ian Gillan: Clear Air Turbulence, 1977; Collectable Records.ru
ILPS 9501 - The Chieftains: Chieftains Live, 1977
ILPS 9502 - Steel Pulse: Handsworth Revolution, 1977
ILPS 9503 - Max Romeo: Reconstruction, 1978
ILPS 9504 - George Faith: To Be A Lover (Label: Black Swan), 1976; Tapir's Reggae Discography
ILPS 9505 - Ultravox!: Ha! Ha! Ha!, 1977
ILPS 9506 - Jess Roden: The Player Not the Game, 1977
ILPS 9507 - War: Platinum Jazz (2LP), 1977
ILPS 9508 - Unknown
ILPS 9509 - Eddie and the Hot Rods: Life On The Line, 1977
ILPS 9510 - Klaus Schulze: Body Love (Soundtrack), 1977
ILPS 9511 - Ian Gillan: Scarabus, 1977
ILPS 9512 - Bunny Wailer: Protest, 1977
ILPS 9513 - Burning Spear: Live, 1977
ILPS 9514 - Unknown
ILPS 9515 - Warsaw Pakt: Needle Time, 1977
ILPS 9516 - Rico Rodriguez: Midnight In Ethiopia (never released)
ILPS 9517 - Bob Marley & The Wailers: Kaya, 1978; Collectable Records.ru
ILPS 9518 - Autograph: Automation. 1978
ILPS 9519 - Illusion: Illusion, 1978
ILPS 9520 - MX-80 Sound: Hard Attack, 1977
ILPS 9521 - I Jah Man: Haile I Hym, 1978
ILPS 9522 - Unknown
ILPS 9523 - Wailing Souls: Wild Suspense, 1978
ILPS 9524 - V.A.: Intensified! (1962–66), 1978
ILPS 9525 - Grace Jones: Fame, 1978
ILPS 9526 - Manu Dibango: Afrovision, 1978
ILPS 9527 - Roundtree: Roller Disco, 1978
ILPS 9528 - Bruce Cockburn: Further Adventures Of, 1978
ILPS 9529 - MX-80 Sound: Hard Attack, 1977
ILPS 9530 - V.A.: One Big Happy Family, 1978
ILPS 9531 - Jess Roden: Stone Chaser, 1979
ILPS 9532 - Justin Hinds & The Dominoes: Just In Time, 1979
ILPS 9533 - Unknown
ILPS 9534 - Toots & the Maytals: Pass The Pipe, 1979
ILPS 9535 - Joe Higgs: Unity Is Power, 1979
ILPS 9536 - Runner: Runner, 1979
ILPS 9537 - Invisible Man's Band: Invisible Man's Band, 1979
ILPS 9538 - Grace Jones: Muse, 1979
ILPS 9539 - Manu Dibango: Gone Clear, 1980
ILPS 9540 - American Standard Band: American Standard Band, 1979
ILPS 9541 - Pablo Moses: A Song, 1980
ILPS 9542 - Bob Marley & The Wailers: Survival, 1979
ILPS 9543 - Unknown
ILPS 9544 - Robert Palmer: Secrets, 1979
ILPS 9545 - Ian Gillan: Live at the Budokan, 1980
ILPS 9546 - Eddie Quinsah: Awo Awo, 1978 (Label: Mango)
ILPS 9547 - Zap Pow: Zap Pow, 1980
ILPS 9548 - Unknown
ILPS 9549 - Unknown
ILPS 9550 - Darryl Way: Concerto For Electric Violin, 1978
ILPS 9551 - Roger McGough: Summer With Monica, 1978
ILPS 9552 - Jade Warrior: Way of the Sun, 1978
ILPS 9553 - Unknown
ILPS 9554 - Third World: Journey To Addis, 1978
ILPS 9555 - Ultravox: Systems Of Romance, 1978
ILPS 9556 - Burning Spear: Social Living,1978
ILPS 9557 - I Jah Man: Are We A Warrior, 1979
ILPS 9558 - Inner Circle: Everything Is Great, 1979
ILPS 9559 - Charlie Dore: Where To Now, 1980
ILPS 9560 - John Martyn: Grace & Danger, 1980
ILPS 9561 - Unknown
ILPS 9562 - Unknown
ILPS 9563 - Eddie and the Hot Rods: Thriller, 1979
ILPS 9564 - Hi-Tension: Hi-Tension, 1978
ILPS 9565 - Cat Stevens: Back to Earth, 1978
ILPS 9566 - Linton Kwesi Johnson: Forces Of Victory, 1979
ILPS 9567 - Burning Spear: Harder Than The Best, 1978
ILPS 9568 - Steel Pulse: Tribute To The Martyrs, 1979
ILPS 9569 - Third World: The Story's Been Told, 1979
ILPS 9570 - Marianne Faithfull: Broken English, 1979
ILPS 9571 - Not issued
ILPS 9572 - Kim Fowley: Snake Document Masquerade, 1979
ILPS 9573 - The Slits: Cut, 1979; Discogs
ILPS 9574 - Third World: Arise In Harmony, 1980
ILPS 9575 - Unknown
ILPS 9576 - Steve Winwood: Arc of a Diver, 1980
ILPS 9577 - In Crowd: Man From New Guinea, 1979
ILPS 9578 - Unknown
ILPS 9579 - Gibson Brothers: Cuba, 1979
ILPS 9580 - The B-52's: The B-52's, 1979
ILPS 9581 - Serge Gainsbourg: Aux Armes Et Cetera, 1979
ILPS 9582 - Unknown
ILPS 9583 - V.A.: Scratch On The Wire, 1979
ILPS 9584 - Unknown
ILPS 9585 - The Buggles: The Age of Plastic, 1980
ILPS 9586 - Unknown
ILPS 9587 - V.A.: Rockers (Soundtrack), 1979
ILPS 9588 - Unknown
ILPS 9589 - Unknown

 HELP series 
A series of budget-priced albums. Those on the Island label used a black variation of the "white i" label with a pink "i" logo and silver print. HELP albums on the Blue Thumb and Bronze labels used their respective designs.

HELP 1 - Emerson, Lake & Palmer: Pictures at an Exhibition, 1971 (originally the catalogue number was assigned as ILPS 9177, the LP number of which was later given to and released as War: All Day Music. But the 8-track cartridge version of "Pictures at an Exhibition" was released as Y8I 9177)
HELP 2 - Robin Williamson: Myrrh, 1972
HELP 3 - Henry Wolff, Nancy Hennings With Drew Gladstone: Tibetan Bells, 1972
HELP 4 - Colosseum: Valentyne Suite (Bronze /UK, Island label /Germany, original on Vertigo)
HELP 5 - Ashley Hutchings: Morris On, 1972
HELP 6 - King Crimson: Earthbound (Live), 1972
HELP 7 - Habibiyya: If Man But Knew, 1972
HELP 8 - National Lampoon: Radio Dinner, 1972 (Label: Blue Thumb)
HELP 9 -  V.A.: The Dynamic Sound Of Jamaica, Volume 1, 1973 (Label: Dragon)
HELP 10 - John Surman: Westering Home, 1972
HELP 11 - Grimms: Grimms, 1973
HELP 12 - Stomu Yamash'ta & Come To The Edge: Floating Music, 1973
HELP 13 - Sun Treader: Zin-Zin, 1973
HELP 14 - Third World: Aiye-Keta, 1973
HELP 15 - V.A.: Soul Of Jamaica, 1973
HELP 16 - Fripp + Eno: No Pussyfooting, 1973
HELP 17 - Ashley Hutchings: The Compleat Dancing Master, 1973
HELP 18 - Basil Kirchin: Worlds Within Worlds (Parts 3 & 4), 1973
HELP 19 - Quiet Sun: Mainstream, 1975; Collectable Records.ru
HELP 20 - V.A. (Fania All Stars): Salsa!, 1974
HELP 21 - Fania All Stars: Salsa Live, 1976
HELP 22 - Fripp + Eno: Evening Star, 1976
HELP 23 - Jorge Ben: Samba Nova, 1976
HELP 24 - Ashley Hutchings: Rattlebone & Ploughjack, 1976
HELP 25 - The Albion Country Band: Battle of the Field, 1976
HELP 26 - James Booker: Junco Partner, 1976
HELP 27 - Renaissance: Illusion, 1976; (original release: 1970)
HELP 28 - Fairport Convention: Live at the L.A. Troubadour, 1976
HELP 29 - Irma Thomas: Live, 1976

 Special "artist related" editions 
IBDB 1 - Bob Dylan and The Band: Before The Flood (2LP), 1974
NDSP 100 - Nick Drake: Fruit Tree (4-LP box set), 1979
SDSP 100 - Sandy Denny: Who Knows Where the Time Goes? (4-LP box set), 1985

 ICD series 
The ICD series comprised the following double albums:
ICD 1/2 - Colosseum: Colosseum Live (2LP; on Bronze label), 1971
ICD 3/4 - Fairport Convention: The History of Fairport Convention (2LP), 1972
ICD 5 - Dave Mason: Scrapbook (2LP), 1972
ICD 6 - Unknown (not released?)
ICD 7 - Unknown (not released?)
ICD 8 - Richard Thompson: (guitar, vocal) (rec. 1967–1976) (2LP), 1976
ICD 9 - various artists: New Orleans Jazz & Heritage Festival 1976 (2LP), 1976

 IDP series 
Two "sampler" LPs were issued using numbers in this series:

IDP 1 - various artists: Bumpers (2LP), 1970
IDLP 1 - various artists: El Pea (2LP), 1971

 ISLD Series 
This was another series used for the following double albums:

ISLD 1 - Uriah Heep: Uriah Heep Live (2LP; on Bronze label), 1973
ISLD 2 - Traffic: On the Road (2LP), 1973 - disc numbers are ISLD 3.1 and ISLD 3.2, thereby conflicting with The Free Story LP number (see below); Collectable Records.ru
ISLD 3 - Free: The Free Story (2LP), 1973 - ISLD 3 used on low numbered sleeves only; record labels have ISLD 4 due to conflict with On The Road disc numbers (see above)
ISLD 4 - Free: The Free Story (2LP), 1973
ISLD 5 - Unknown (not released?)
ISLD 6 - Paul Horn: A Special Edition (2LP), 1973
ISLD 7 - King Crimson: A Young Person's Guide to King Crimson (2LP), 1975 (rec. 1969–1975) -note: includes previously unreleased Judy Dyble-vocal version of "I Talk To The Wind".
ISLD 8 - War: War Live (2LP), 1973
ISLD 9 - Incredible String Band: Seasons They Change (2LP), 1976
ISLD 10 - Go: Live From Paris (2LP), 1976
ISLD 11 - Bob Marley & The Wailers: Babylon By Bus (2LP), 1978

 ISS series 
ISS 2 - Fairport Convention: Tour Sampler - promotional, limited to 500 copies.

 USA/Canada releases 1970s 

 LPs on the Island label (distributed by Capitol Records) 
SW-9178 - Mott the Hoople: Brain Capers, 1971 (Canada only)
SMAS-9300 - Bronco: Country Home, 1970
SMAS-9302 - Blondel: Evensong, 1970
SMAS-9303 - White Noise: An Electric Storm, 1971 (UK release in 1969)
SW-9304 - Reebop Kwaku Baah: Reebop, 1971
SMAS-9305 - Habibiyya: If Man But Knew, 1971
SW-9306 - Traffic: The Low Spark of High Heeled Boys, 1971
SMAS-9307 - Nick Drake: Nick Drake, 1971 (compilation of tracks from his first two UK albums)
SW-9308 - Alan Bown: Listen, 1971 (UK release in 1970)
SMAS-9309 - Bronco: Ace Of Sunlight, 1971
SW-9310 - Blondel: Fantasia Lindum, 1971
SMAS-9311 - John Martyn: Bless The Weather, 1971
SMAS-9312 - Luther Grosvenor: Under Open Skies, 1971
SMAS-9313 - Mike Harrison: Mike Harrison, 1971
SW-9314 - Jim Capaldi: Oh How We Danced, 1972
SW-9315 - Sutherland Brothers: Sutherland Brothers Band, 1972
SW-9316 - Claire Hamill: One House Left Standing, 1972
SMAS-9317 - Smith-Perkins-Smith: Smith-Perkins-Smith, 1972
SMAS-9318 - Nick Drake: Pink Moon, 1972
SMAS-9319 - Henry Wolff, Nancy Hennings With Drew Gladstone: Tibetan Bells, 1972
SMAS-9320 - Kossoff, Kirke, Tetsu and Rabbit: Kossoff, Kirke, Tetsu and Rabbit, 1972
SW-9321 - Mike Harrison: Smokestack Lightning, 1972
SW-9322 - Patto: Roll 'Em, Smoke 'Em, Put Another Line Out, 1972
SW-9323 - Traffic: Shoot Out at the Fantasy Factory, 1973
SW-9324 - Free: Heartbreaker, 1973 (UK release in 1972)
SW-9325 - John Martyn: Solid Air, 1973 (UK release in 1972)
SW-9326 - Sutherland Brothers & Quiver: Lifeboat, 1973 (some tracks same as UK Sutherland Brothers LP [ILPS 9212], some tracks re-recorded with Quiver, some totally new tracks)
SW-9327 - Blondel: England, 1973 (UK release in 1972)
SMAS-9328 - Rabbit: Broken Arrows, 1972
SW-9329 - The Wailers: Catch a Fire, 1973 (Original flip-top "cigarette lighter" cover)
SW-9331 - Claire Hamill: October, 1973
SMAS-9333 - NO GO! - Motion Picture Soundtrack, 1973
SMAS-9334 - Stomu Yamashta's Red Buddha Theatre - Music From The Play "The Man From The East", 1973
SMAS-9335 - John Martyn: Inside Out, 1973
SMAS-9336 - Traffic: On The Road, 1973 (single disc version released in North America only)
SW-9337 - Spooky Tooth: Witness, 1973
SMAS-9338 - The Wailers: Burnin', 1973
SMAS-9339 - Blondel: Blondel, 1973
SW-9340 - Sandy Denny: Like an Old Fashioned Waltz, 1974
SW-9341 - Sutherland Brothers & Quiver: Dream Kid, 1974, (UK release in 1973)
SW-9343 - Jimmy Cliff: Struggling Man, 1974

 LPs on the Antilles label 
AX-7000 - various artists: The Greater Antilles Sampler, 1976
AN-7006 - Henry Wolff, Nancy Hennings With Drew Gladstone: Tibetan Bells (reissue), 1976
AN-7010 - Nick Drake: Five Leaves Left (reissue), 1976
AN-7011 - White Noise: An Electric Storm (reissue), 1976
AN-7028 - Nick Drake: Bryter Layter (reissue), 1976
AN-7071 - Roomful Of Blues: Let's Have A Party, 1979
AN-7076 - Blackfoot: No Reservations (reissue), 1979
AN-7081 - John Martyn: Grace & Danger (reissue), 1980

 UK releases 1980s 

 Singles of the 1980s 

 WIP series 
For singles released during the years 1980 to 1983, which were numbered in this series, see Singles of the 1970s section, above.

 IS series 
This new series of numbers was introduced in 1983 to replace the long-running WIP series for 7" singles (and other formats). As the CD format gained ascendancy during the later 1980s, so more and more singles were released with the prefix CID, indicating a CD release, initially alongside the "standard" 7" release.

IS 101 - David Joseph: "You Can't Hide (Your Love From me)"; 12": 12IS 101
IS 102 - The Powell Family: "No Problem" / "Dub Cut", 1983; 12": 12IS 102
IS 104 - Robert Palmer: "You Are In My System", 1983; 12": 12IS 104 
IS 106 - Gwen Guthrie: "Hopscotch" / "You're The One", 1983; 12": 12IS 106, 12" Promo: 12IS 106
IS 107 - The B-52's: "Future Generation", 1983; 12": Island 12IS 107
IS 108 - Bob Marley: "Buffalo Soldier" / "Buffalo Dub", 1983; 12": Tuff Gong 12IS 108
IS 109 - U2: "Two Hearts Beat as One", 1983 12": 12IS 109
IS 110 - Set The Tone: "Rap Your Love" (12": 12IS 110), 1983
IS 111 - Paul Haig: Heaven Sent (12": 12IS 111), Label: Les Disques du Crepuscule, 1983
IS 112 - Marcia Griffiths: Electric Boogie / Electric Boogie (Long Version) b/w Electric Boogie (Dub 1) / Electric Boogie (Dub 2) / Electric Boogie (Dub 3) (12": Island 12IS 112), 1983
IS 116 - David Joseph: Let's Live It Up (12": 12IS116), 1983
IS 117 - Tom Tom Club: The Man With The 4 Way Hips (12": 12IS 117), 1983
IS 119 - Peech Boys: On A Journey (12": 12IS 119), 1983
IS 120 - Big Brother: Adventures In Success Parts 1 & 2 (12": 12IS 120), 1983
IS 121 - Robert Palmer: You Can Have It (Take My Heart) (12": 12IS 121), 1983
IS 122 - King Sunny Ade & His African Beats: Synchro System (12": 12IS 122), 1983
IS 123 - Cat Stevens: Morning has Broken / Moonshadow, 1983
IS 124 - Paul Haig: Never Give Up (Party, Party) (12": 12IS 124), 1983
IS 126 - Antena: "Be Pop"; 12": 12IS 126, 1983
IS 129 - Toots Hibbert: Spiritual Healing / Spiritual Healing - Instrumental b/w Spiritual Healing (Long version) (12": 12IS 129), 1983
IS 130 - Kid Creole & The Coconuts: There's Something Wrong In Paradise (12": 12IS 130), 1983
IS 132 - Club House: Do It Again / Billy Jean (12": 12IS 132), 1983
IS 133 - Black Uhuru: Party Next Door / Party In Session (12": 12IS 133), 1983
IS 135 - Time Zone: The Wildstyle (12": 12IS 135), Label: Celluloid, 1983
IS 138 - Paul Haig: Justice (12": 12IS 138), Label: Les Disques du Crépuscule, 1983
IS 139 - Ruichi Sakamoto: Riot In Lagos (12": 12IS 139), 1980
IS 145 - Will Powers: Smile (12": 12IS 145), 1983
IS 146 - Grandmixer D.ST.: Crazy Cuts (12": 12IS 146), 1983
IS 147 - Club House: Superstition / Good Times (12": 12IS147), 1983
IS 150 - Black Uhuru: "What Is Life?" b/w "Solidarity" / "Party Next Door" (12": 12IS 150), 1983
IS 156 - Will Powers: Adventures In Success (12": 12IS 156), 1983
IS 158 - Mel Brooks: To Be Or Not To Be (The Hitler Rap) (12": IVA 12IS 156), Label: Island Visual Arts, 1983
IS 160 - Aswad: Chasing For The Breeze / Gave You My Love (12": Island 12IS 160), 1984. - Aswad: Chasing For The Breeze / Gave You My Love & Aswad: Dub Chase / Have This Dub (2x12": Island 12 ISX 160), 1984
IS 162 - Alexei Sayle: "'Ullo John! Gotta New Motor?" (12": 12IS 162), 1983
IS 164 - Mon Dino: La Danse Des Mots (12": Disques Zou-A-Ves 12IS 164), 1983
IS 165 - Keith LeBlanc: Malcolm X: No Sell Out (12": Tommy Boy 12IS 165), 1983
IS 167 - The Earons: Land Of Hunger (12": 12IS 167), 1984
IS 169 - Bob Marley And The Wailers: "One Love" / "People Get Ready" (Extended Version) b/w "So Much Trouble In The World" / "Keep On Moving" (12": Island 12IS 169), 1984. — Bob Marley And The Wailers: "One Love" / "People Get Ready" (Extended Version) (12": Island 12ISX 169), 1984
IS 170 - Aswad: "54 46 (Was My Number)" / "54 46 (Was My Number)" Horns Revival b/w "Java" / "Warrior Charge" (Trouble Mix) (12": Island 12IS 170), 1984
IS 171 - Junie Morrison: "Techno-Freqs; 12": ZE /Island 12IS 171 
IS 176 - Papa Levi: "Bonnie & Clyde" / "Warning" (12": Island 12IS 176), 1984
IS 178 - Breakfast Club: "Rico Mambo"; 12": Island 12IS 178
IS 180 - Bob Marley & The Wailers: Waiting in Vain / Blackman Redemption b/w Marley Mix Up: Exodus/Positive Vibration/Pimpers Paradise/Punky Reggae Party (12": Island 12IS 180), 1984
IS 181 - King Sunny Ade: "Ase"; 12": Island 12IS 181
IS 182 - Amazulu: "Moonlight Romance", 1984
IS 188 - West Indian Touring Team: "West Indians Are Back In Town" / "Skipper Lloyd" (12": Islalnd 12IS 188), 1984
IS 191 - Pearl Harbour: "Hula Love"; 10": Island 10IS 191 /UK, 1984
IS 193 - Animal Nightlife: "Mr. Solitaire"; 12": 12IS 193
IS 194 - Special Request: "Take It To The Max"; 12": 12IS 194
IS 196 - Dean Fraser: Redemption Song / Harmour Love (12": Island 12IS 196), 1984
IS 198 - Paul Haig: "The Only Truth"; 12": 12IS 198
IS 200 - Animal Nightlife: "Love Is Just The Great Pretender"; 12": 12IS 200
IS 201 - Amazulu: Excitable, 1985
IS 202 - U2: Pride (In the Name of Love) (12": Island 12IS 202), 1984
IS 206 - Grace Jones: "Slave To The Rhythm"; 12": 12IS 206
IS 207 - Force MC's: "Forgive Me Girl" / "Itchin' For A Scratch"; 12": Island 12IS 208
IS 208 - Papa Levi: "Big 'n' Broad" / "'84 'tion"; 12": Island 12IS 208, 1984
IS 209 - John Martyn: "Over The Rainbow" b/w "Rope Soul'd", 1984
IS 210 - Bob Marley & The Wailers: "Could You Be Loved" / "Jamming" b/w "No Woman No Cry" / "Coming From The Cold" (12": Island 12IS 210), 1984
IS 214 - Aswad: "Need Your Love (Each And Every Day)" / "Rainfall, Sunshine"; 12": Island 12IS 214, 1984
IS 215 - 3-D: "Greatest Beat Megamix"; 12": Island 12IS 215
IS 216 - Dumb Guys: "Rap-O-Matic Rap"; 12": Island 12IS 216
IS 219 - Third World: "Now That We've Found Love"; also released on 7": Island ISX 219 (with a remixed version by Paul Hardcastle), 12": Island 12IS 219, 12": Mango 12ISX 219, all UK, 1985
IS 220 - U2: "The Unforgettable Fire" (12": Island 12IS 220), 1985
IS 222 - Globe & Pow Wow: "Celebrate! (Evereybody)"; 12": Island 12IS 222
IS 228 - Jah Wobble & Ollie Marland: "Love Mystery"; 12": island 12IS 228
IS 229 - G.L.O.B.E. & Whiz Kid: "He's Got The Beat"; 12": 12IS 229
IS 233 - Amazulu: "Don't You Just Know It"
IS 238 - Sly and Robbie: "Get To This, Get To That"; 12": Island 12IS238
IS 240 - Grace Jones: "Pull Up To The Bumper" (Remix); 12": Island 12IS 240
CID 318 - Julian Cope: "Eve's Volcano (Covered In Sin)" / "Almost Beautiful Child (I & II)"/ "Pulsar N.X. (live)" / "Shot Down (live)", 1987
IS 319 - U2: "With or Without You", 1987
IS 328 - U2: "I Still Haven't Found What I'm Looking For", 1987
IS 336 - Steve Winwood: "Valerie" b/w "Talking Back To The Night", 1987
IS 353 - Bourgeois Tagg: "I Don't Mind At All" b/w "Pencil and Paper", 1987
IS 355 - MC Smart: Chargin' Warrior (12": 12IS 355, Mango label), 1988
CID 378 - Reggae Philharmonic Orchestra: Minnie The Moocher (7" version, 12" version) / Dangling (instrumental)
IS 387 - Overlord X: 2 Bad (12": 12IS 387, Mango label), 1988
IS 399 - Julian Cope: "5 O'Clock World" (10": 10IS 399 /UK)
CID 406 - Julian Cope: "China Doll" / "Crazy Farm Anaimal" / "Rail On" / "Desi", 1989
IS 407 - Freshski Dames: Kicking It Live (12": 12IS 407, Mango Street label), 1989
CID 408 - Gavin Friday & The Man Seezer: Each Man Kills the Thing He Loves
IS 411 - U2: "When Love Comes To Town", 1989
IS 415 - Overlord X: Radical Kickbag (12": 12IS 415, Mango label), 1989
IS 430 - Gavin Friday And The Man Seezer: You Take Away The Sun (5"CD: Island CID 430), 1989
IS 447 - London Posse: Live Like The Other Half Do (12": 12IS 447, Mango label), 1989

 LPs of the 1980s 

 Island ILPS series (1979 - 1991) 
During this period Island regained some more important artists on its roster and continued to release 20 to 50 albums a year. The catalogue numbers don't follow the release dates as the numbers were given to projects scheduled for release. Usually the "Day & Night" label was in use for albums. Some new labels entered the Island distribution and were given Island catalogue numbers received for UK release while retaining their original labels (e.g. ZE, Celluloid).

ILPS 9590 - Toots & the Maytals : Just Like That (1980)
ILPS 9591 - Sugar Minott : Black Roots (1979)
ILPS 9592 - Grace Jones : Warm Leatherette (1980)
ILPS 9593 - Black Uhuru : Sinsemilla (1980)
ILPS 9594 - Strand : Strand (1980)
ILPS 9595 - Robert Palmer : Clues (1980)
ILPS 9596 - Bob Marley & The Wailers : Uprising (1980) Collectable Records.ru
ILPS 9597 - Various Artists : More Original Ska: 1963-1967 (1980)
ILPS 9598 - Various Artists : Club Ska '67 (1980)
ILPS 9599 - Aswad : Live & Direct (1983)
ILPS 9600 - not issued
ILPS 9601 - Various Artists : The Secret Policemen's Ball (1980)
ILPS 9602 - Utopia : Adventures in Utopia (1979)
ILPS 9603 - The Jags : Evening Standards (1980)
ILPS 9604 - The Distractions : Nobody's Perfect (1980)
ILPS 9605 - Linton Kwesi Johnson : Bass Culture (1980)
ILPS 9606 - Michael Prophet : Serious Reasoning (1980)
ILPS 9607 - Roger Powell : Air Pocket (1980)
ILPS 9608 - Inner Circle : New Age Music (1980)
ILPS 9609 - not issued
ILPS 9610 - not issued
ILPS 9611 - Aswad : Hulet (1979)
ILPS 9612 - not issued
ILPS 9613 - Steel Pulse : Caught You (1980)
ILPS 9614 - Ultravox : Three Into One (1979)
ILPS 9615 - Vivian Jackson (aka Yabba U) : Jah Jah Way (1980)
ILPS 9616 - Third World : Prisoner In The Street (1980)
ILPS 9617 - Rivits : Multiplay (1980)
ILPS 9618 - Randy Vanwarmer : Terraform (1980)
ILPS 9619 - Tony Tuff (aka Winston Morris):  Tony Tuff (1980)
ILPS 9620 - Gibson Brothers : On The Riviera (1980)
ILPS 9621 - not issued
ILPS 9622 - The B-52's : Wild Planet (1980)
ILPS 9623 - Jacob "Killer" Miller : Mixed Up Moods (1980)
ILPS 9624 - Grace Jones : Nightclubbing (1981)
ILPS 9625 - Black Uhuru : Red (1981)
ILPS 9626 - Rockats : Live At The Ritz (1981)
ILPS 9627 - Plastics : Welcome Back (1981)
ILPS 9628 - not issued
ILPS 9629 - Bunny Wailer : Bunny Wailer Sings The Wailers (1981)
ILPS 9631 - The Paragons : Sly & Robbie Meet The Paragons (1981)
MLPS 9632 - Various Artists : The "King" Kong Compilation (Label: Mango), 1981
ILPS 9633 - Pablo Moses - Pave The Way (1981)
ILPS 9634 - not issued
ILPS 9635 - The Melodians - Sweet Sensations (1981)
ILPS 9636 - not issued
ILPS 9637 - Foghat - Tight Shoes (1980)
ILPS 9638 - not issued
ILPS 9639 - not issued
ILPS 9640 - Various Artists : Crucial Reggae Driven By Sly & Robbie (1981)
ILPS 9641 - Basement 5 : 1965-1980 (1980)
ILPS 9642 - Utopia : Deface the Music (1980)
ILPS 9643 - not issued
ILPS 9644 - Brian Briggs : Brian Damage  (1980)
ILPS 9645 - not issued
ILPS 9646 - U2 : Boy (1980)
ILPS 9647 - Toots & the Maytals : Live (1980)
ILPS 9648 - Marianne Faithfull : Dangerous Acquaintances (1981)
ILPS 9649 - Judy Mowatt : Black Woman (label: Island/Grove Muzic) (1980)
ILPS 9650 - Linton Kwesi Johnson : LKJ in Dub (1980)
ILPS 9651 - not issued
ILPS 9652 - not issued
ILPS 9653 - not issued
ILPS 9654 - Kate & Anna McGarrigle - French Record (not issued; transferred to Hannibal HNBL 1302)
ILPS 9655 - The Jags : No Tie Like A Present (1981)
ILPS 9656 - Ryuichi Sakamoto : B2-Unit (1980)
ILPS 9657 - Todd Rundgren Healing  (1981)
ILPS 9658 - Manu Dibango : Ambassador (1981)
ILPS 9659 - not issued
ILPS 9660 - not issued
ILPS 9661 - not issued
ILPS 9662 - Various Artists : Sly And Robbie Present Taxi (1981)
ILPS 9663 - not issued
ILPS 9664 - not issued
ILPS 9665 - Robert Palmer : Maybe It's Live, 1982
ILPS 9666 - Was (Not Was) : Was (Not Was) (1981)
ILPS 9667 - Various Artists : SeiZE The Beat (Label: ZE), 1981
MLPS 9668 - Sly and Robbie : The Sixties + Seventies + Eighties = Taxi (Label: Mango), 1981
ILPS 9669 - Gregory Isaacs : More Gregory, 1981
ILPS 9670 - Toots & the Maytals : Knock Out, 1981
ILPS 9671 - Jimmy Riley : Rydim Driven (Label: Taxi), 1981
ILPS 9672 - not issued
ILPS 9673 - Sly Dunbar : Sly-Go-Ville, 1982
ILPS 9674 - not issued
ILPS 9675 - Adrian Belew : Lone Rhino (1982)
ILPS 9676 - Pete Shelley : Homo Sapiens (Label: Genetic), 1981
ILPS 9677 - not issued
ILPS 9678 - not issued
ILPS 9679 - not issued
ILPS 9680 - U2 : October, 1981
ILPS 9681 - not issued
ILPS 9682 - Excalibur : Excalibur, 1981
ILPS 9683 - not issued
ILPS 9684 - not issued
ILPS 9685 - not issued
ILPS 9686 - Tom Tom Club : Tom Tom Club, 1981
XILP 9687 - Charlélie Couture : Poèmes Rock, 1981
ILPS 9688 - Elli & Jacno : Tout Va Sauter 1980
ILPS 9689 - not issued
ILPS 9690 - Mathématiques Modernes : Les Visiteurs Du Soir (Label: Celluloid), 1981
ILPS 9691 - not issued
ILPS 9692 - Alan Vega : "Collision Drive" (Label: Celluloid), 1981
ILPS 9693 - Material : "Memory Serves" (Label: Celluloid /Metropolis), 1981
ILPS 9694 - not issued
ILPS 9695 - not issued
ILPS 9696 - Black Uhuru : Tear It Up, 1982
ILPS 9697 - Various Artists : Sound d'Afrique (Label: Mango), 1982
ILPS 9698 - Various Artists : The Secret Policeman's Other Ball (The Music), 1982
ILPS 9699 - Gwen Guthrie : Gwen Guthrie, 1982
ILPS 9700 - Joe Cocker : Sheffield Steel, 1982
ILPS 9701 - Black Uhuru : Chill Out, 1982
ILPS 9702 - not issued
ILPS 9703 - not issued
ILPS 9704 - not issued
ILPS 9705 - Various Artists : Raiders Of The Lost Dub, 1981
ILPS 9706 - Cat Stevens : Morning Has Broken, 1981
ILPS 9707 - not issued
ILPS 9708 - Peer Raben : Lili Marleen (Soundtrack) (Label: Metropolis), 1981
ILPS 9709 - not issued
ILPS 9710 - not issued
ILPS 9711 - Aswad : A New Chapter Of Dub, 1982
ILPS 9712 – King Sunny Adé : Ju Ju Music, 1982
ILPS 9713 - Barry Reynolds : I Scare Myself, 1982
ILPS 9714 - Tony Tuff Tuff : Selection, 1982
ILPS 9715 - John Martyn - The Electric, 1982
ILPS 9716 - not issued
ILPS 9717 - Michael Smith : Mi Cyaan Believe It, 1982 Discogs
ILPS 9718 - not issued
ILPS 9719 - Free : Completely Free,  1982
ILPS 9720 - Robert Palmer : Pride,  1983
ILPS 9721 - Gregory Isaacs : Night Nurse, 1982
ILPS 9722 - Grace Jones : Living My Life, 1982
ILPS 9723 - Aswad : Live and Direct, 1983
ILPS 9724 - not issued
ILPS 9725 - not issued
ILPS 9726 - not issued
ILPS 9727 - not issued
ILPS 9728 - not issued
ILPS 9729 - not issued
ILPS 9730 - Various Artists : Crucial Reggae - Driven By Sly & Robbie, 1982
ILPS 9731 - not issued
ILPS 9732 - Jackie Genova : Work That Body, 1983
ILPS 9733 - U2 : War, 1983
ILPS 9734 - Marianne Faithfull : A Childs Adventure, 1983
ILPS 9735 - Szajner : Brute Reason, 1983
ILPS 9736 - Set The Tone : Shiftin' Air Affair  1983
ILPS 9737 - King Sunny Adé : Synchro System, 1983
ILPS 9738 - Tom Tom Club : Close To The Bone, 1983
ILPS 9739 - David Joseph : The Joys Of Life, 1983
ILPS 9740 - Louise Bennett : Yes'm, Dear: Miss Lou Live, 1983
ILPS 9741 - not issued
ILPS 9742 - Paul Haig : Rhythm Of Life, 1983
ILPS 9743 - Kid Creole And The Coconuts : Doppelganger, 1983
ILPS 9744 - not issued
ILPS 9745 - not issued
ILPS 9746 – King Sunny Adé : Aura, 1984
ILPS 9747 - Rupert Hine : The Wildest Wish To Fly, 1983
ILPS 9748 - Gregory Isaacs : Out Deh!, 1983
ILPS 9749 - Jackie Genova : Work That Body into Ski-Shape, 1983
ILPS 9750 - Joe Cocker : Sheffield Steel, 1982
ILPS 9751 - Adrian Belew : Lone Rhino, 1982
ILPS 9752 - Black Uhuru : Chill Out, 1983
ILPS 9753 - Barry Briggs : Wide Awake (Label: Mango), 1983
ILPS 9754 - Various Artists : Sound D'Afrique (Label: Mango), 1983
ILPS 9755 - not issued
ILPS 9756 - Black Uhuru - The Dub Factor (Label: Mango), 1983
ILPS 9757 - Various Artists : They Call it an Accident (Soundtrack), 1983
ILPS 9758 - Gwen Guthrie : Portrait, 1983
ILPS 9759 - The B-52s : Whammy, 1983
ILPS 9760 - Bob Marley and the Wailers : Confrontation, 1983
ILPS 9761 - NYC Peech Boys : Life Is Something Special, 1983
ILPS 9762 - Tom Waits : Swordfish Trombones, 1983
ILPS 9763 - not issued
ILPS 9764 - not issued
ILPS 9765 - Will Powers : Dancing for Mental Health, 1983
ILPS 9766 - not issued
ILPS 9767 - not issued
ILPS 9768 - Adrian Belew : Twang Bar King, 1983
ILPS 9769 - Black Uhuru : Anthem, 1984
ILPS 9770 - Linton Kwest Johnson : Making History, 1984)
ILPS 9771 - not issued
ILPS 9772 - not issued
ILPS 9773 - Black Uhuru : Anthem (Remixed), 1984
ILPS 9774 - Lee Perry : History Mystery Prophesy, 1984
ILPS 9775 - The Skatalites : Return of the Big Guns, 1984
ILPS 9776 - not issued
ILPS 9777 - Steve Winwood : Talking Back to the Night, 1982
ILPS 9778 - Dean Fraser : Pumping Air, 1984
ILPS 9779 - John Martyn : Saffire, 1984
ILPS 9780 - Aswad : Rebel Souls, 1984
ILPS 9781 - Toots and the Maytals : Reggae Greats, 1985
ILPS 9782 - Gregory Issacs : Reggae Greats, 1985
ILPS 9783 - Steel Pulse : Reggae Greats, 1985
ILPS 9784 - Various Artists : Reggae Greats, 1985
ILPS 9785 - Burning Spear : Reggae Greats, 1985
ILPS 9786 - Linton Kwest Johnson : Reggae Greats, 1985
ILPS 9787 - Sly & Robbie : Reggae Greats, 1985
ILPS 9788 - Various Artists : Strictly for Lovers, 1985
ILPS 9789 - Third World : Reggae Greats, 1985
ILPS 9790 - Pablo Moses : Reggae Greats, 1985
ILPS 9791 - Jacob Miller : Reggae Greats, 1985
ILPS 9792 - Lee Perry : Reggae Greats, 1985
ILPS 9793 - Black Uhuru : Reggae Greats, 1985
ILPS 9794 - Jimmy Cliff : Reggae Greats, 1985
ILPS 9795 - Wailers : Reggae Greats, 1985
ILPS 9796 - Various Artists : Strictly for Rockerss, 1985
ILPS 9797 - not issued
ILPS 9798 - not issued
ILPS 9799 - not issued
ILPS 9800 - Ini Kamuze : Statement, 1984
ILPS 9801 - Robert Palmer : Riptide, 1985
ILPS 9802 - The Long Ryders : State of our Union; 1985
ILPS 9803 - Tom Waits : Rain Dogs, 1985 Discogs
ILPS 9804 - not issued
ILPS 9805 - Rain Parade - Crashing Dream, 1985
ILPS 9806 - Anthrax : Spreading The Disease, 1985
ILPS 9807 - John Martyn : Piece By Piece, 1986
ILPS 9808 - not issued
ILPS 9809 - Arrow : Knock Dem Dead, 1985
ILPS 9810 - not issued
ILPS 9811 - not issued
ILPS 9812 - not issued
ILPS 9813 - not issued
ILPS 9814 - not issued
ILPS 9815 - not issued
ILPS 9816 - not issued
ILPS 9817 - not issued
ILPS 9818 - not issued
ILPS 9819 - not issued
ILPS 9820 - not issued
ILPS 9821 - not issued
ILPS 9822 - not issued
ILPS 9823 - Cat Stevens : Footsteps in the Dark, 1984
ILPS 9824 – Pearl Harbor : Pearl’s Galore, 1984
ILPS 9825 - Various Artists : Tommy Boy: Greatest Beats, 1985
ILPS 9826 - Nick Drake : Heaven in a Wildflower: An Explanation of Nick Drake, 1985
ILPS 9827 - Ronald Shannon Jackson & the Decoding Society : Decode Yourself, 1985
ILPS 9828 - Wobble & Marland : "Neon Moon", 1985
ILPS 9829 - not issued
ILPS 9830 - Animal Nightlife : Shangri La, 1985
ILPS 9831 - Sly & Robbie : Language Barrier, 1985
ILPS 9832 - not issued
ILPS 9833 - Various Artists : Power Jam '85, 1985
ILPS 9834 - Various Artists : Masters of the Beat, 1985
ILPS 9835 - not issued
ILPS 9836 - not issued
ILPS 9837 - Force MD's : Tender Love, 1985
ILPS 9838 - not issued
ILPS 9839 - not issued
ILPS 9840 - not issued
ILPS 9841 - not issued
ILPS 9842 - not issued
ILPS 9843 - Bob Marley & The Wailers : Rebel Music, 1986
ILPS 9844 - Steve Winwood : Back in the High Life, 1986; Collectable Records.ru
ILPS 9845 - Ini Kamoze - Pirate, 1986
ILPS 9846 - Courtney Pine : Journey To The Urge Within, 1986
ILPS 9847 - not issued
ILPS 9848 - not issued
ILPS 9849 - Shriekback : Big Night Music, 1986
ILPS 9850 - not issued
ILPS 9851 – Amazulu : Amazulu, 1985
ILPS 9852 - not issued
ILPS 9853 - not issued
ILPS 9854 - not issued
ILPS 9855 - The Comsat Angels : Chasing Shadows, 1986
ILPS 9856 - Junior Delgado : Raggamuffin Year, 1986
ILPS 9857 - not issued
ILPS 9858 - not issued
ILPS 9859 - not issued
ILPS 9860 - not issued
ILPS 9861 - Julian Cope : Saint Julian. 1987
ILPS 9862 - Various Artists : Taxi Connection: Live in London, 1986 
ILPS 9863 - not issued
ILPS 9864 - not issued
ILPS 9865 - Anthrax : Among the Living, 1987
ILPS 9866 - not issued
ILPS 9867 - not issued
ILPS 9868 - not issued
ILPS 9869 - The Long Ryders : Two Fisted Tales, 1987
ILPS 9870 - not issued
ILPS 9871 - The B-52's : Bouncing Off the Satellites, 1986
ILPS 9872 - not issued
ILPS 9873 - Fairport Convention : In Real Time (Live '87), 1987
ILPS 9874 - Marianne Faithfull : Strange Weather, 1987
ILPS 9875 - not issued
ILPS 9876 - The Christians : The Christians, 1987
ILPS 9877 - Buckwheat Zydeco : On a Night Like This, 1987
ILPS 9878 - Various Artists : Serious Dub, 1987
ILPS 9879 - Melissa Etheridge : Melissa Etheridge, 1988
ILPS 9880 - not issued
ILPS 9881 - not issued
ILPS 9882 - not issued
ILPS 9883 - Fairport Convention : "In Real Time: Live '87", 1987
ILPS 9884 - not issued
ILPS 9885 - The Triffids : Calenture, 1987
ILPS 9886 - not issued
ILPS 9887 - not issued
ILPS 9888 - not issued
ILPS 9889 - not issued
ILPS 9890 - not issued
ILPS 9891 - not issued
ILPS 9892 - not issued
ILPS 9893 - not issued
ILPS 9894 - not issued
ILPS 9895 - not issued
ILPS 9896 - not issued
ILPS 9897 - Wally Baradou : Waves of a Mountain, 1987
ILPS 9898 - not issued
ILPS 9899 - not issued
ILPS 9900 - not issued
ILPS 9901 - not issued
ILPS 9902 - not issued
ILPS 9903 - not issued
ILPS 9904 - not issued
ILPS 9905 - not issued
ILPS 9906 - not issued
ILPS 9907 - not issued
ILPS 9908 - not issued
ILPS 9909 - not issued
ILPS 9910 - Shriekback - Go Bang!, 1988
ILPS 9911 - not issued
ILPS 9912 - not issued
ILPS 9913 - not issued
ILPS 9914 - not issued
ILPS 9915 - not issued
ILPS 9916 = Anthrax : State of Euphoria, 1988
ILPS 9917 - Buckwheat Zydeco : Taking It Home, 1988
ILPS/CID 9918 - Julian Cope : My Nation Underground, 1988
ILPS 9919 - not issued
ILPS 9920 - Kevin McDermott Orchestra : Mother Nature's Kitchen, 1989
ILPS 9921 - Jim Capaldi : Some Come Running, 1988
ILPS 9922 - not issued
ILPS 9923 - Etta James : Seven Year Itch, 1988
ILPS 9924 - not issued
ILPS 9925 - Gavin Friday : Each Man Kills The Thing He Loves, 1989
ILPS 9926 - not issued
ILPS 9927 - Leatherwolf : Street Ready, 1989
ILPS 9928 = The Triffids : The Black Swan, 1989
ILPS 9929 - Various Artists: Scandal Ska, 1989
ILPS 9930 - not issued
ILPS 9931 - not issued
ILPS 9932 - not issued
ILPS 9933 - not issued
ILPS 9934 - not issued
ILPS 9935 - not issued
ILPS 9936 - not issued
ILPS 9937 - not issued
ILPS 9938 - Vain : No Respect, 1989
ILPS 9939 - not issued
ILPS 9940 - not issued
ILPS 9941 - not issued
ILPS 9942 - not issued
ILPS 9943 - not issued
ILPS 9944 - Robert Palmer : Addictions, Vol. 1, 1989
ILPS 9945 - Free : The Free Story, 1989
ILPS 9946 - Webb Wilder : Hybrid Vigor, 1989
ILPS 9947 - not issued
ILPS 9948 - The Christians : Colour, 1990
ILPS 9949 - Hinterland : Kissing the Roof of Heaven, 1990
ILPS 9950 - not issued
ILPS 9951 - not issued
ILPS 9952 - not issued
ILPS 9953 - not issued
ILPS 9954 - not issued
ILPS 9955 - not issued
ILPS 9956 - not issued
ILPS 9957 - not issued
ILPS 9958 - John Mayall : A Sense of Place, 1990
ILPS 9959 - not issued
ILPS 9960 - not issued
ILPS 9961 - not issued
ILPS 9962 - not issued
ILPS 9963 - Stevie Salas : Colorcode, 1990
ILPS 9964 - not issued
ILPS 9965 - not issued
ILPS 9966 - not issued
ILPS 9967 - Anthrax : Persistence of Time, 1990
ILPS 9968 - not issued
ILPS 9969 - not issued
ILPS 9970 - not issued
ILPS/CID 9971 - Claudia Brücken : Love: And A Million Other Things (1991)
ILPS 9972 - not issued
ILPS 9973 - Nine Inch Nails: Pretty Hate Machine (1989)
ILPS 9974 - not issued
ILPS 9975 - not issued
ILPS 9976 - not issued
ILPS 9977 - Julian Cope : Peggy Suicide, 1991
ILPS 9978 - not issued
ILPS 9979 - not issued
ILPS 9980 - Anthrax : Attack of the Killer L's, 1991
ILPS 9981 - not issued
ILPS 9982 - not issued
ILPS 9983 - Gavin Friday : Adam 'N' Eve, 1992
ILPS 9984 - not issued
ILPS 9985 - not issued
ILPS 9986 - not issued
ILPS 9987 - not issued
ILPS 9988 - Ronny Jordan : The Antidote, 1992
ILPS 9989 - not issued
ILPS 9990 - not issued
ILPS 9991 - Drivin' N Cryin': Fly Me Courageous (1991)
ILPS 9992 - not issued
ILPS 9993 - Tom Waits : Bone Machine, 1992
ILPS 9994 - not issued
ILPS 9995 - not issued
ILPS 9996 - not issued
ILPS 9997 - Julian Cope : Jehovahkill, 1992
ILPS 9998 - Courtney Pine : In the Eyes of Creation, 1992
ILPS 9999 - not issued

 Island ISSP series 
ISSP 4003 - V.A.: Sound d'Afrique, 1981LP: Island ISSP 4003, Side 1 / UK, 1981 LP: Island ISSP 4003, Side 2 / UK, 1981CD: Mango CCD 9697 /US, ca. 1990ISSP 4004 - V.A.: Disco Rough (Celluloid label), 1982; Discogs
ISSP 4006 - The B-52's: Mesopotamia, 1982; Discogs
ISSP 4007 - V.A.: Genius Of Rap, (2LP-set), 1982; Discogs
ISSP 4008 - V.A.: Sound d'Afrique Vol. 2, 1982LP: Island ISSP 4008, Side 1 / UK, 1982 LP: Island ISSP 4008, Side 2 / UK, 1982CD: Mango CCD 9754 /US, ca. 1990ISSP 4012 - Taxi Gang: Electro Reggae Vol. 1 (Mango label), 1986

 ZE ILPS series 
Around 1980 Island started to distribute a New York-based label, run by Michael Zilkha and Michael Esteban. In the UK the catalogue numbers were composed by the ILPS prefix and numbers starting at 7000. In the US the label was distributed via Islands Antilles label and division.
ILPS 7000 - Casino Music: Jungle Love, 1979
ILPS 7001 - Lizzy Mercier Descloux: Press Color, 1979
ILPS 7002 - The Contortions: Buy, 1979
ILPS 7003 - unreleased
ILPS 7004 - Cristina: Cristina, 1980
ILPS 7005 - unreleased
ILPS 7006 - unreleased
ILPS 7007 - Suicide: Suicide, 1980 (second album)
ILPS 7008 - James White & The Blacks: Off White, 1980
ILPS 7009 - unreleased
ILPS 7010 - Suicide Romeo, 1980
ILPS 7011 - Davitt Sigerson, 1980
ILPS 7012 - Kid Creole And The Coconuts: Off The Coast Of Me, 1980
ILPS 7013 - V.A.: Mutant DiscoILPS 7014 - Kid Creole And The Coconuts: Fresh Fruit In Foreign Places, 1981
ILPS 7015 - Was (Not Was): Was (Not Was), 1981
ILPS 7016 - Kid Creole And The Coconuts: Tropical Gangsters, 1982
ILPS 7017 - V.A.: A Christmas Record, 1981
ILPS 7018 - Sweet Pea Atkinson: Don’t Walk Away, 1982
ILPS 7019 - John Cale: Music For A New Society, 1982
ILPS 7020 - unreleased
ILPS 7021 - unreleased
ILPS 7022 - V.A.: A Christmas Record (Special 1982 Edition), 1982
ILPS 7023 - James White's Flaming Demoniacs, 1983
ILPS 7024 - John Cale: Caribbean Sunset, 1984
ILPS 7025 - Davitt Sigerson: Falling In Love Again, 1984
ILPS 7026 - John Cale: Comes Alive, 1984

 Artist related editions 
Tom Waits
ITWCD 4 - Tom Waits: Big Time, 1988

U2

(CD versions add "CID" to the beginning)
U26 - The Joshua Tree, 1987
U27 - Rattle and Hum, 1988
U28 - Achtung Baby, 1991
U29 - Zooropa, 1993
U210 - Pop, 1997
U211 - Best of 1980-1990, 1998
U212 - All that you can't leave behind, 2000
U213 - Best of 1990-2000, 2002
U214 - How to dismantle an atomic bomb, 2004
U218 - U218 Singles, 2006
U219 - No Line on the Horizon, 2009

 Island Reggae Greats 
In 1985, Island release 15 compilation albums dedicated to reggae, presenting twelve of its best (selling) reggae artists and three styles, "DJ", "lovers" and "rockers", on one disc each. The albums were compiled by Trevor Wyatt, the covers were illustrated by various artists on the basis of paintings and contain extensive liner notes.

This part of the Island Records discography can be found here: Island Reggae Greats

 Island CID 101 series 
After the CD format was introduced on the record market Island reacted coolly by releasing only a small number of bestsellers during 1984/1985 introducing the CID (Compact Island Disc) prefix with catalogue numbers starting at 101. Soon after the company started to release new CDs and to re-release older material with the CID prefix and the "ILPS" catalogue numbers. 
CID 101 - Frankie Goes To Hollywood: Welcome To The Pleasuredome (ZTT label), 1985
CID 102 - U2: Unforgettable Fire
CID 103 - Bob Marley: Legend
CID 104 - Wally Badarou: Echoes
CID 110 - U2: Boy
CID 111 - U2: October
CID 112 - U2: War
CID 113 - U2: Under A Blood Red Sky
CID 120 - Philip Glass: Koyaanisqatsi
CID 126 - Propaganda: A Secret Wish (ZTT label)
CID 127 - Andrew Poppy: The Beating Of Wings (ZTT label)
CID 128 - Sly & Robbie: Language Barrier
CID 130 - Robert Palmer: Riptide
CID 131 - Tom Waits: Raindogs, 1985
CID 132 - Grace Jones: Island LifeCD: Island CID 132 / 610 584-222  / UK/Germany, 1985 Island Masters 
In 1989, Island Records was sold to Polygram. Immediately Polygram started to re-release parts of the Island catalogue, mainly classics from the 1970s and good selling records from the 1980s within a CD series called Island Masters. The series ran with the prefix IMCD and catalogue numbers starting with 1. The first year of the label has seen more than 70 releases. Finally the catalogue comprised more than 300 titles, from the year 2000 on in re-mastered quality.

The discography can be seen under Island Masters.

 UK releases 1990s and 2000s 

 Singles of the 1990s and 2000s 

 The IS/CID series 
As CD became the preferred format for the majority of sales, singles released in that format were prefixed CID. Otherwise, the series continued the numbering of the IS series begun in the 1980s. Singles released on a variety of vinyl formats (7", 10", 12", etc.) continued to be prefixed IS (or 10IS, 12IS, etc.). Frequently, CD and larger format releases included additional (or sometimes different) songs to those found on the traditional 7" format.

CID 463 - Hinterland: "Desert Boots", July 1990
CID 470 - Anthrax: "In My World", 1990
CID 471 - Claudia Brücken: "Absolut(e)", 1990; CD; 12": 12IS 471 / UK 
CID 477 - This Ragged Jack: "The Party's Over", 1990; 12": 12IS 477 / UK
CID 479 - Claudia Brücken: "Kiss Like Ether", 1990; 12": 12IS 479 / 878 449-1 /UK; 12"-Promo: 12IS 479DJ
CID 482 - Nine Inch Nails: "Down In It", 1990; 12": 12IS 482 / UK
IS 483 - Julian Cope: "Beautiful Love" b/w "Port of Saints", 2/1991
CID 484 - Nine Inch Nails: "Head Like A Hole", 1990/1991; 10"-Picture Disc: 10ISP 484 /UK; 12": 12IS 484
CID 490 - Anthrax: "Bring The Noise", 1991; CD; 12": 12IS 490 / UK
IS 492 - Julian Cope: "East Easy Rider" b/w "Butterfly E", 1991
CID 496 - Top: "Number One Dominator", 1991
CID 497 - Julian Cope: "Head E.P.", 1991; 12": 12IS 497 /UK
CID 498 - Robert Palmer: "Every Kinda People", 1991; 12": 12IS 498 /UK
CID 499 - Screaming Target: "Knowledge 'N' Numbers", 1991; 12": 12IS 499 / UK
CID 500 - U2: "The Fly", 22.10.1991; 12": 12IS 500 / UK
IS 524 - Robert Palmer: "You're In My System"; 12IS 524 DJ /UK
IS 548 - The Cranberries: "Dreams" b/w "What You Were", 1992; 12": 12IS 548 (includes extra track "Liar")
IS 550 - U2: "Who's Gonna Ride Your Wild Horses", 1992
CID 559 - The Cranberries: "Linger (Live)" / "I Still Do (Live)" b/w Waltzing (Live)" / "Pretty (Live)", 1994; 10": 10IS 559 / 858 241-0 / UK
CID 576 - Sheep On Drugs: "Let The Good Times Roll", 1994; 10": 10IS 576 / UK
IS 591 - The Wedding Present: "It's A Gas" b/w "Bubbles", 1994
ISC 595 - Pulp: The Sisters EP ("Babies", "Your Sister's Clothes" b/w "Seconds", "His'n'Hers"), 1994
IS 600 - The Cranberries: "Zombie" b/w "Away", 1994
IS 601 - The Cranberries: "Ode To My Family" b/w "So Cold In Ireland", 1994
IS 629 - V.A.: Don't Be A Menace; 12": 12IS 629 DJ / UK promo
IS 647 - Lewis Taylor: "Whoever"; 12": 12IS 647 DJ / UK promo
IS 653 - Lewis Taylor: "Bittersweat"; 12": 12IS 653 DJ /UK promo
IS 687 - Carrie: "Molly" b/w "Split Up Song", 1998
IS 689 - Hinda Hicks: "If You Want Me"; 12": 12IS 689 DJ / UK promo; 12": 12ISX 689 DJ / UK promo
IS 700 - Hinda Hicks: "You Think You Own me"; 12": 12ISX 700 DJ / UK promo
CID 711 - Paul Weller: Brand New Start, 1998
CID 718 - PJ Harvey: A Perfect Day Elise', 1998
CID 721 - Hinda Hicks: Truly, 1998
CID 724 - Talvin Singh: OK, 1998
IS 738 - Elcka: "Pleasure"; 12": 12IS 738 DJ / UK promo
IS 740 - Witness: "Scars" b/w "More Miles Away" and "Long First Chapter", 1999
IS 749 - Witness: "Audition" b/w "Blind Soul Mime" and "Could've Had A Time", 1999
IS 758 - Witness: "Hijacker" b/w "Lowjacker", 1999
IS 816 - Bon Garçon: The E.P.; 12": 12IS 816 DJ / UK promo
IS 849 - Keane: "Somewhere Only We Know" b/w "Snowed Under", 2004

 The Island Jamaica series 
IJA 2005 - Chaka Demus & Pliers: Every Kinda People, 1996 (IJA 2005DJ: promo 12" single)
IJA 2007 - Luciano meets Jungle Brothers: Who Could It Be, 1995 
IJA 2008 - Luciano: Life, 1996  (IJA 2008DJ: promo 12" single)
IJA 2009 - Frankie Oliver: She Lied To Me, 1996 (IJA 2009DJ > promo 12" single)
IJCD 2016 - Frankie Oliver: Who's Gonna Do It, 1997 (5"CD-single)

 LPs/CDs in the 1990s and 2000s 

 The CID 8000 series 
In 1992, Island had reached catalogue number 9999 for its ILP/ILPS series and continued at number 8000. As the principal medium had changed since several years, CID became the general prefix. The independent catalogue numbers seem to have stopped being assigned to Island albums in June 2006. 
CID 8000 - Julian Cope: Floored Genius, 1992
CID 8001 - Apachi Indian: No Reservation, 1993
CID 8002 - PJ Harvey: Rid Of Me, 1993
CID 8003 - The Cranberries: Everybody Else Is Doing It So, 1993
CID 8004 - Nine Inch Nails: Broken, 1992
CID 8006 - Sheep On Drugs: Greatest Hits, 1993
CID 8007 - Inner Circle feat. Jacob Miller, 1992
CID 8008 - Drivin 'n' Cryin': Smoke, 193
CID 8010 - Melissa Etheridge: Yes I Am, 1993
CID 8011 - Kid Creole And The Coconuts: Cre-ole (Best of ...), 1993
CID 8012 - Nine Inch Nails: The Downward Spiral, 1993
CID 8013 - not issued
CID 8014 - The Wedding Present: Watusi, 1994
CID 8015 - not issued
CID 8016  - Apache Indian: Make Way for the Indian, 1995
CID 8017 - Jah Wobble: Take Me To God, 1993
CID 8018 - V.A.: Peace Together, 1993
CID 8019 - V.A.: Young Americans, 1993
CID 8020 - Sheep On Drugs: On Drugs, 1993
CID 8021 - Tom Waits: Black Rider,1993
CIDD 8022 - The Orb: live ´93, 1993
CIDX 8023 - Marianne Faithfull: A Collection of Her Best Recordings, 1994
CID 8024 - Ronny Jordan meets DJ Crush: Bad Brothers, 1994
CID 8025 - Pulp: His'n'Hers, 1994
CID 8026 - V.A. (Soundtrack): In The Name Of The Father, 1994
CID 8027 - Anthrax: Live - The Island Years, 1994
CID 8028 - deus: Synthology, 1994
CID 8029 - The Cranberries: No Need To Argue, 1994
CID 8030 - not issued
CID 8031 - Deus: My Sister = My Clock, 1995
CID 8032 - The Orb: The Orb's Adventures Beyond the Underworld, 1991
CID 8033 - The Orb: U.F. Orb, 1995
CID 8034 - Santana: Brothers, 1994
CID 8035 - PJ Harvey: To Bring You My Love, 1995
CID 8036 - Gavin Friday: Shag Tobacco, 1995
CID 8037 - The Orb: Orbus Terrarum, 1995
CID 8038 - Marianne Faithfull: A Secret Life, 1995
CID 8039 - Towering Inferno: Kaddish, 1995
CID 8040 - Moondog Jr.: Every Day I Wear a Greasy Black Feather on My Hat, 1995
CID 8041 - Pulp: Different Class, 1996
CID 8042 - Melissa Etheridge: Your Little Secret, 1995
CID 8043 - Passengers: Original Soundtracks 1, 1995
CID 8044 - Jah Wobble's Invaders Of The Heart: Heaven And Earth, 1996
CID 8045 - Salt: ausculate
CID 8046 - Puressence: Traffic Jam in Memory Lane, 1996
CID 8047 - Ronny Jordan: Light to Dark, 1996
CID 8048 - The Cranberries: To the Faithful Departed, 1996
CID 8049 - Lewis Taylor, 1996
CID 8050 - Red House Painters: Songs for a Blue Guitar, 1996
CID 8051 - John Parrish & P.J. Harvey: Songs for a Blue Guitar, 1996
CID 8052 - Deus: In A Bar, Under The Sea, 1996
CID 8053 - Various Artists: Later, Vol. 1, 1996
CID 8054 - Various Artists: Later, Vol. 2: Slow Beats, 1996
CID 8055 - The Orb: Orblivion, 1997
CID 8056 - Salad: Ice Cream, 1997
CID 8057 - Elcka: Rubbernecking, 1997
CID 8058 - Paul Weller: Heavy Soul, 1997
CID 8059 - Morrissey: Maladjusted, 1997
CID 8060 - Soul II Soul: Time For Change, 1997
CID 8061 - Soundtrack: Face, 1997
CID 8062 - not issued
CID 8063 - not issued
CID 8064 - Puressence: Only Forever, 1997
CID 8065 - Various Artists: The Birth of the Cool Seven, 1997
CID 8066 - Pulp: This Is Hardcore, 1998
CID 8067 - not issued
CID 8068 - Hinda Hicks: Hinda, 1998
CID 8069 - Carrie: Fear of Sound, 1998
CIDM 8070 - Angelique Kidjo: Oremi (Mango label), 1998
CID 8071 - Tricky: Angels With Dirty Faces, 1998
CID 8072 - not issued
CID 8073 - Lodger: A Walk in the Park, 1998
CID 8074 - Tindersticks: Donkeys '92-97, 1998
CIDM 8075 - Talvin Singh: O.K. (Mango label), 1998
CID 8076 - P.J. Harvey: Is This Desire?, 1998
CID 8077 - Soundtrack: Lock, Stock & Two Smoking Barrels, 1998
CID 8078 - The Orb: U.F. Off - The Best of The Orb, 1998
CID 8079 - Cat Stevens: Remember - The Ultimate Collection, 1999
CID 8080 - Paul Weller: Modern Classics - The Greatest Hits, 1998
CID 8081 - Deus: The Ideal Crash, 1999
CID 8082 - not issued
CID 8083 - not issued
CID 8084 - Witness: Before the Calm, 1999
CID 8085 - Tindersticks: Simple Pleasure, 1999
CID 8086 - not issued
CID 8087 - Tricky: Juxtapose, 1999
CID 8088 - The Little Mothers: Worry, 1999
CID 8089 - not issued
CID 8090 - Ocean Colour Scene: One From The Modern, 1999
CID 8091 - Nine Inch Nails: Fragile, 1999
CID 8092 - G:MT - Greenwich Mean Time (Music From The Film), 1999
CID 8093 - Paul Weller: Heliocentric, 2000
CID 8094 - The Million Dollar Hotel (Music From The Motion Picture), 1999
CID 8095 - Me One: As Far as I'm Concerned, 2000
CID 8096 - Various Artists: Randall & Hopkirk (Deceased), 2000
CID 8097 - not issued
CID 8098 - Lewis Taylor: Lewis II, 2000
CID 8099 - P.J. Harvey: Stories from the City, Stories from the Sea, 2000
CID 8100 - The Orb: Cydonia, 2001
CID 8101 - Young Love: Too Young to Fight It, 2007
CID 8102 - Nine Inch Nails: Things Fall Apart, 2000
CID 8103 - Talvin Singh: Ha, 2001
CID 8104 - Ocean Colour Scene: Mechanical Number, 2001
CID 8105 - not issued
CID 8106 - Stereo MC's: Deep Down & Dirty, 2001
CID 8107 - not issued
CID 8108 - not issued
CID 8109 - Custom Blue: All Follow Everyone, 2002
CID 8110 - Pulp: We Love Life, 2001
CID 8111 - Ocean Colour Scene: Songs From the Front Row - The Best of Ocean Colour Scene, 2001
CID 8112 - Frou Frou: Details, 2002
CID 8113 - not issued
CID 8114 - Tricky: A Ruff Guide, 2002
CID 8115 - Ali G Indahouse: Da Soundtrack, 2002
CID 8116 - not issued
CID 8117 - not issued
CID 8118 - D.J. Shadow: The Private Press, 2002
CID 8119 - Martin Grech: Open Heart Zoo, 2002
CID 8120 - Naughty by Nature: Licons (Icons), 2002
CID 8121 - Default: Fallout, 2002
CID 8122 - Sugababes: Angels With Dirty Faces, 2002
CID 8123 - Music from the Motion Picture Swimfan, 2002
CID 8124 - Puressence: Planet Helpless, 2002
CID 8125 - Stereo MC's: Retroactive - The Best of Stereo MC's, 2002
CID 8126 - Pulp: Hits, 2002
CID 8127 - not issued
CID 8128 - David Holmes: Analyze That (Soundtrack), 2003
CID 8129 - not issued
CID 8130 - The Good Thief: Original Soundtrack & Music From The Film, 2003
ILPSD 8131 - D.J. Shadow: The Private Repress, 2003
CID 8132 - Sevendust: Animosity, 2003
CID 8133 - Nothingface: Skeletons, 2003
CID 8134 - BellX1: Music in Mouth - New Version, 2004
CID 8135 - Span: Mass Distraction, 2004
CID 8136 - Party Monster: Original Motion Picture Soundtrack, 2003
CID 8137 - Sugababes: Three, 2003
CID 8138 - Love Actually: The Original Soundtrack, 2003
CID 8139 - not issued
CID 8140 - Sevendust: Seasons, 2003
CID 8141 - Nick Drake: Made to Love Magic, 2004
CID 8142 - Shaun Of The Dead: Music From The Motion Picture, 2004
CID 8143 - P.J. Harvey: Uh Huh Her, 2004
CID 8144 - not issued
CID 8145 - Keane: Hopes and Fears, 2004
CID 8146 - D.J. Shadow: Live! In Tune and On Time, 2004
CID 8147 - Chiniki: Lick Your Ticket, 2004
CID 8148 - Amy Winehouse: Frank, 2003
CID 8149 - Nick Drake: A Treasury - The Best of Nick Drake, 2004
CID 8150 - Bridget Jones: The Edge Of Reason - The Original Soundtrack, 2004
CID 8151 - not issued
CID 8152 - not issued
CID 8153 - not issued
CID 8154 - Dogs: Turn Against This Land, 2005
CID 8155 - Nine Inch Nails: With Teeth, 2005
CID 8156 - Leaves: Angela Test, 2005
CID 8157 - Martin Grech: Unholy, 2005
CID 8158 - Nine Black Alps: Everything Is, 2005
CID 8159 - not issued
CID 8160 - not issued
CID 8161 - Bellx1: Flock, 2006
CID 8162 - Sugababes: Taller in More Ways, 2005
CID 8163 - Ladytrum: Witching Hour
CID 8164 - not issued
CID 8165 - Fightstar: Grand Unification, 2005
CID 8166 - Nine Black Alps: Gutter Gulch EP, 2006
CID 8167 - Keane: Under the Iron Sea, 2006

 Island Jamaica/Island Jamaica Jazz 
Island released for a short while Jamaican music on new sub-labels Island Jamaica and Island Jamaica Jazz, the latter one obviously responding to the success of bands like Jazz Jamaica and the music by trombone soloists like Rico Rodriguez.
IJCD 4002 - Ernest Ranglin: Below The Bassline, 1996
IJCD 4003 - Dean Fraser: Big Up!, 1997
IJCD 4004 - Ernest Ranglin: Memories Of Barber Mack, 1997
IJCD 4005 - The Skatalites: Ball Of Fire, 1997

 Island Masters 
The series that started in the late 1980s continued in the first half of the 1990s releasing more material from Island's back catalogue.

The discography can be found under Island Masters.

 Reggae Refreshers 
This series started with 26 releases in 1990. Island used the new label to re-issue a part of its reggae catalogue. Confusing was that some of the titles were also released within the Island Masters series or deleted shortly after the release to be re-released otherwise (the Bob Marley & The Wailers catalogue). More titles had been reissued in 1995, while the parent label changed at least for the European releases from Island to Mango. The UK prefixes were RRCD for CD releases and RRCT for cassettes. Numbers started with 1. Two compilations (numbered 101 and 102 respectively) were released to accompany the series.

RRCDS 101 - Various Artists: Reggae Refreshers, 1990
RRCD 1 - The Wailers: Catch a FireRRCD 2 - The Wailers: Burnin'RRCD 3 - Bob Marley & The Wailers: Natty DreadRRCD 4 - Bob Marley & The Wailers: Confrontation, original release: 1983
RRCD 5 - Bob Marley & The Wailers: Rebel MusicRRCD 6 - Bunny Wailer: Blackheart ManRRCD 7 - Bunny Wailer: ProtestRRCD 8 - Bunny Wailer: Sings The WailersRRCD 9 - Gregory Isaacs: Night NurseRRCD 10 - Lee Perry: Reggae GreatsRRCD 11 - Jimmy Cliff: The Harder They ComeRRCD 12 - Black Uhuru: SinsemillaRRCD 13 - Lee Perry: Super ApeRRCD 14 - The Heptones: Party TimeRRCD 15 - Burning Spear: Man In The HillsRRCD 16 - Third World: 96 Degrees In The ShadeRRCD 17 - Steel Pulse: Tribute To The MartyrsRRCD 18 - Black Uhuru: RedRRCD 19 - The Heptones: Night FoodRRCD 20 - Burning Spear: Marcus Garvey / Garvey's GhostRRCD 21 - Toots & The Maytals: Funky KingstonRRCD 22 - Jimmy Cliff: Reggae GreatsRRCD 23 - Max Romeo: War Ina BabylonRRCD 24 - Steel Pulse: Handsworth RevolutionRRCD 25 - Ijahman: Are We A WarriorRRCD 26 - Linton Kwesi Johnson: Bass CultureRRCD 27 - Aswad: Distant ThunderRRCD 28 - Black Uhuru: The Dub Factor; Discogs
RRCD 29 - Sly & Robbie: A Dub Experience - Reggae GreatsRRCD 30 - Dillinger: CB 200; Discogs
RRCD 31 - George Faith: To Be A Lover (Have Mercy)RRCD 32 - Linton Kwesi Johnson: Forces Of VictoryRRCD 33 - not issued
RRCD 34 - Linton Kwesi Johnson: LKJ In DubRRCD 35 - Ijahman: Haile I Hymn (Chapter One)RRCD 36 - Various: Sly & Robbie Present TaxiRRCD 37 - Various: Crucial Reggae - Driven By Sly & RobbieRRCD 38 - Dean Fraser: Pumpin' Air, original released in 1984
RRCD 39 - Sugar Minott: Black RootsRRCD 40 - Burning Spear: Dry And HeavyRRCD 41 - Black Uhuru: AnthemRRCD 42 - Gregory Isaacs: Reggae Greats - LiveRRCD 43 - Black Uhuru: Chill OutRRCD 44 - Various Artists: Countryman-OSTRRCD 45 - Various Artists: Rockers-SoundtrackRRCD 46 - Gregory Isaacs: Out Deh!RRCD 47 - Jah Lion: Colombia CollyRRCD 48 - Michael Prophet: Serious Reasoning (With 2 Bonus Track)
RRCD 49 - not issued
RRCDS 102 - Various Artists: Reggae Refreshers Vol. 2, 1995
RRCD 50 - Jimmy Cliff: The Best Of Jimmy CliffRRCD 51 - not issued
RRCD 52 - Augustus Pablo: Classic RockersRRCD 53 - Wailing Souls: Wild SuspenseRRCD 54 - Rico: Roots To The BoneRRCD 55 - Lee "Scratch" Perry: From The Secret Laboratory; Discogs
RRCD 56 - Burning Spear: Harder Than The BestRRCD 57 - Junior Murvin: Police & Thieves; Discogs
RRCD 58 - Toots & The Maytals: Reggae Got SoulRRCD 59 - Ini Kamoze: StatementRRCD 60 - Various Artists: The Original Soundtrack From Countryman (New Edition)
RRCD 61 - Various Artists: The Harder They Come [Original Soundtrack Recording]'' (New Edition)

CID/IS series 
IS 878 - U2: "Vertigo", 2004
IS 886 - U2: "Sometimes You Can't Make It On Your Own", 2005

ISLR series (promotional use only) 
ISLR 15890-2 - Fefe Dobson: "Take Me Away", 2003
ISLR 15979-2 - Fefe Dobson: "Everything", 2004 
ISLR 16085-2 - Fefe Dobson: "Don't Go (Girls and Boys)", 2004
ISLR 16269-2 - Fefe Dobson: "Don't Let It Go to Your Head", 2005
ISLR 16518-2 - Fefe Dobson: "This is My Life" (MAINSTREAM VERSION), 2006
ISLR 16521-2 - Fefe Dobson: "This is My Life" (ALBUM VERSION), 2006

Island Masters/Island Re-Masters series 
While there was no clear label policy the Island Masters were reactivated under the title Island Remasters with remastered works of the back catalogue and more reissues to reach the catalogue number 320 in 2005.

The discography can be found under Island Masters.

References

External links
Discogs Database

 
Discographies of British record labels